= East of England Regional Assembly =

- Formation: 1999
- Dissolved: 2010
- Legal status: Regional chamber
- Headquarters: Flempton
- Region served: East of England
- Budget: £140 million (2006/07)
- Website: eera.gov.uk

The East of England Regional Assembly was the regional chamber for the East of England region of the England. It was based at Flempton, near Bury St Edmunds in Suffolk. The assembly was created as a voluntary regional chamber in 1998 by the Regional Development Agencies Act 1998. The first meeting was held in March 1999. In July 2003 the assembly was reconstituted to combine its existing functions with those of the regional arm of the Local Government Association and of the Regional Employers Organisation. The assembly was abolished on 31 March 2010, its functions transferring to the newly constituted East of England Local Government Association.

== Organisation ==
Membership of the assembly was not by direct election. The assembly had 102 members made up as follows:

- 54 members from local government (one from each of the local authorities)
- 16 further members from local government, drawn to reflect political balance
- 31 members nominated by stakeholders (must total 30%)
- 1 member from the Broads Authority

Membership lasts one year and begins in July.

=== Leadership ===
- Chair of the Assembly, Leader of the Conservative Group – Cllr Sue Sida-Lockett (Suffolk County Council)
- Deputy Chair, Leader of the Community Stakeholder Group – Michael Allen (Stakeholder)
- Deputy Chair, Leader of the Labour Group – Cllr John Kent (Thurrock Borough Council)
- Deputy Chair, Leader of the Liberal Democrat Group – Cllr Chris White (Hertfordshire County Council)

== Role ==
The assembly acted as the representative voice of the region and works to promote its economic, social and environmental well-being. The key functions of the assembly were:

- Co-ordinate the public expenditure of local authorities
- Act as regional planning body
- Scrutinise the work of the regional development agency

Following criticism of the regional assemblies, it was proposed in July 2007 that they will be axed, losing their role by 2010 with powers passing to the East of England Development Agency and to local authorities.

== East of England Plan ==
The East of England Plan, a Revision to the Regional Spatial Strategy for the East of England, was published on 12 May 2008

== See also ==
- East of England
- East of England Development Agency
- East of England Regional Strategy Board
