= North East Assembly =

- Formation: 1999
- Dissolved: 2009
- Legal status: Regional chamber
- Headquarters: Gateshead
- Region served: North East England

North East Assembly (NEA) was an unelected regional chamber for the North East region of England, established in 1999 by the Regional Development Agencies Act 1998.

A proposal to establish a directly elected regional assembly was rejected in a referendum held in November 2004.

The regional chamber was abolished in March 2009 with its functions being transferred to One NorthEast, the Regional Development Agency, and the Association of North East Councils, the Local Authority Leaders’ Board.

== Proposed elected regional assembly ==
In May 2002, the UK government published a white paper, Your Region, Your Choice, outlining its plans for the possible establishment of Elected Regional Assemblies. A draft bill for a directly elected regional assembly for the North East England was published in July 2004 by the Deputy Prime Minister John Prescott. However, an elected regional assembly was not established as the proposal was rejected in a referendum held in November 2004.

=== Powers and structure ===
The draft Regional Assemblies Bill outlined the structure of the proposed assembly and defined its powers.

==== Structure ====
The assembly would have had the following structure:

- The assembly would be a body corporate with a distinct legal identity.
- Each assembly would have between 25 and 35 assembly members elected by the Additional Member System.
- The assembly would select one member as the Chairman and another as Deputy Chairman to preside over its debates.
- The assembly would have an Executive Committee (cabinet) composed of a Leader and between two and six other Executive Members.

==== Powers ====
The draft bill would have given the assembly the following powers:

- Promotion of economic development
- Promotion of social development
  - Promote health, safety and security of the community
  - Reduce health inequalities
  - Enhance individual participation in society
  - Improve the availability of good housing
  - Improve skills and the availability of training
  - Improve the availability of cultural and recreational activities
- Improvement and protection of the environment
- Additional functions and duties that the Secretary of State thinks appropriate

== See also ==
- North East Combined Authority
- Tees Valley Combined Authority
