= Yorkshire and Humber Assembly =

Regional chamber

- Formation: 1999
- Dissolved: 2009
- Legal status: Regional chamber
- Headquarters: Wakefield
- Region served: Yorkshire and the Humber

Yorkshire and Humber Assembly was the regional chamber for the Yorkshire and the Humber region of England. It closed on 31 March 2009. The responsibilities of the assembly were assumed by a joint regional board consisting of members of Yorkshire Forward, the regional development agency, and Local Government Yorkshire and Humber, a regional partnership of local authorities.

== See also ==
- 2004 North East England devolution referendum
