= West Midlands Regional Assembly =

- Formation: 1999
- Dissolved: 2010
- Legal status: Regional chamber
- Headquarters: Birmingham
- Region served: West Midlands
- Website: wmra.gov.uk

The West Midlands Regional Assembly (WMRA) was the regional chamber for the West Midlands region of England, established in 1999. It was based in Birmingham. It was abolished on 31 March 2010, its functions transferring to West Midlands Leaders Board and to Advantage West Midlands.

== Organisation ==
The assembly was not an elected body and was made up of 100 members of which:

- 68 were nominated from local authorities across the region, including county, district, borough and city councils.
- 16 were from the business sector.
- 16 were from regional interest groups such as trade unions, parish councils and environmental groups.

== Role ==
The main functions performed by the WMRA included:

- Channelling regional opinions to the business-led regional development agency (Advantage West Midlands).
- Carrying out advocacy and consultancy roles with national government bodies and the European Union,
- The Assembly is the Regional Planning Body with a duty to formulate a Regional Spatial Strategy.
