= Flempton =

Village in Suffolk, England

Coordinates: 52.3°N 0.65°E

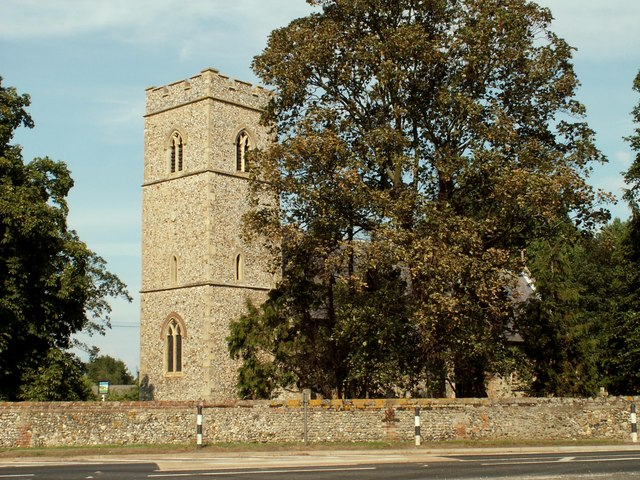
- St. Catherine's church, Flempton

- Location within Suffolk
- Area: 1.47 sq mi (3.8 km^{2})
- Population: 149 (2011)
  - Density: 101/sq mi (39/km^{2})
- District: West Suffolk
- Shire county: Suffolk
- Region: East
- Country: England
- Sovereign state: United Kingdom
- Post town: Bury St Edmunds
- Postcode district: IP28
- UK Parliament: West Suffolk

Flempton is a village and civil parish in the West Suffolk district of Suffolk, England. It is on the A1101 road 5 miles NW from Bury St Edmunds.

Flempton takes its name from the Flemings who came from Flanders and settled the area in Anglo-Saxon times. The Domesday Book records the population of Flempton in 1086 to be 16 households. According to the 2011 census the parish had a population of 149 in 68 households.

St Catherine's church is a grade II* listed building whose tower was rebuilt in 1839 after it collapsed.

Flempton is grouped with Hengrave to form a parish council made up of eight members, four from each parish.

The East of England Regional Assembly was based in Flempton House until 2010. The former village pub is The Greyhound on The Green which closed in 2016. It is close to the River Lark.

Flempton Forge and nearby Forge Cottage are grade II listed buildings on The Green. The forge has recently been converted to a holiday let.
