= Regional employers organisations =

There are nine regional employers organisations in England, corresponding to the regions of England, and one each for Wales and Northern Ireland.

== Structure ==
They represents the interests of local authorities as major employers, specialising in human resources, organisational development and employee relations. In most cases they are integrated into the Local Government Association's regional bodies, although some have a distinct identities or have continued exist where there is no longer a regional body. Each is a member of the National Association of Regional Employers.

== List of organisations ==
They are:

- East of England Local Government Association (employers' services division)
- East Midlands Councils (employers' services division)
- London Councils (employers' services division)
- North East Regional Employers' Organisation
- North West Employers
- South East Employers
- South West Councils (employers' services division)
- West Midlands Employers
- Yorkshire and Humber Local Authority Employers' Association
- Welsh Local Government Association (employers' services division)
- Northern Ireland Local Government Association (employers' services division)

== See also ==
- Local authority leaders' board
