= Regional assembly (England) =

Former regional bodies in England

The regional chambers of England were a group of indirectly elected regional bodies that were created by the provisions of the Regional Development Agencies Act 1998. There were eight regional chambers, one for each of the regions of England except Greater London, which had opted for an elected mayor and assembly in 1998. All eight regional chambers had adopted the title "regional assembly" or "assembly" as part of their name, though this was not an official status in law. The chambers were abolished over a two-year period between 31 March 2008 and 31 March 2010 and some of their functions were assumed by newly established local authority leaders' boards.

Greater London has a directly elected London Assembly, which was established by separate legislation and is part of the Greater London Authority.

== Role ==
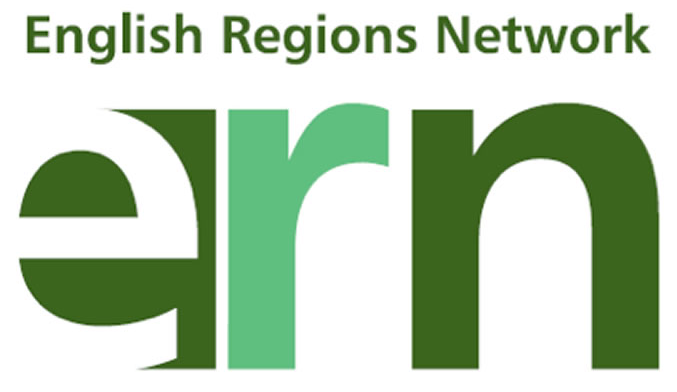
Logo of the English Regions Network

Their original defined role was to channel regional opinions to the business-led regional development agencies. Their role later included scrutinising their regional development agency; integrating policy development and enhancing partnership working at the regional level across the social, economic and environmental policy agenda; as well as carrying out a wide range of advocacy and consultancy roles with UK government bodies and the European Union; but their public profile was low. Each acted as a regional planning body with a duty to formulate a regional spatial strategy including regional transport strategy, replacing the planning function of county councils.

The English Regions Network (ERN) was the umbrella organisation for England's eight partnership regional chambers. While the London Assembly worked with ERN on some issues it was not a full member of the Network.

== Membership ==
The eight regional chambers as defined by the Regional Development Agencies Act 1998 were not directly elected. About two-thirds of assembly members were appointees from the county and district councils and unitary authorities in each region, the remaining one-third were appointees from other regional interest groups.

The London Assembly is part of a wider Greater London Authority and has 25 directly elected members. Its role is defined in the Greater London Authority Act 1999.

== The regional chambers ==
Links to the assemblies

There was some inconsistency in the naming of the individual assemblies. Each chamber adopted either "regional assembly" or "assembly":

- East of England Regional Assembly (abolished March 2010)
- East Midlands Regional Assembly (abolished March 2010)
- North East Assembly (abolished March 2009)
- North West Regional Assembly (abolished June 2008)
- South East England Regional Assembly (abolished March 2009)
- South West Regional Assembly (abolished May 2009)
- West Midlands Regional Assembly (abolished March 2010)
- Yorkshire and Humber Assembly (abolished March 2009)

The London Assembly was established as a directly elected body by separate legislation and is part of the Greater London Authority. It continues to exist after the abolition of the eight regional chambers.

Each assembly corresponded to a region of England.

== Plans for elected regional assemblies ==
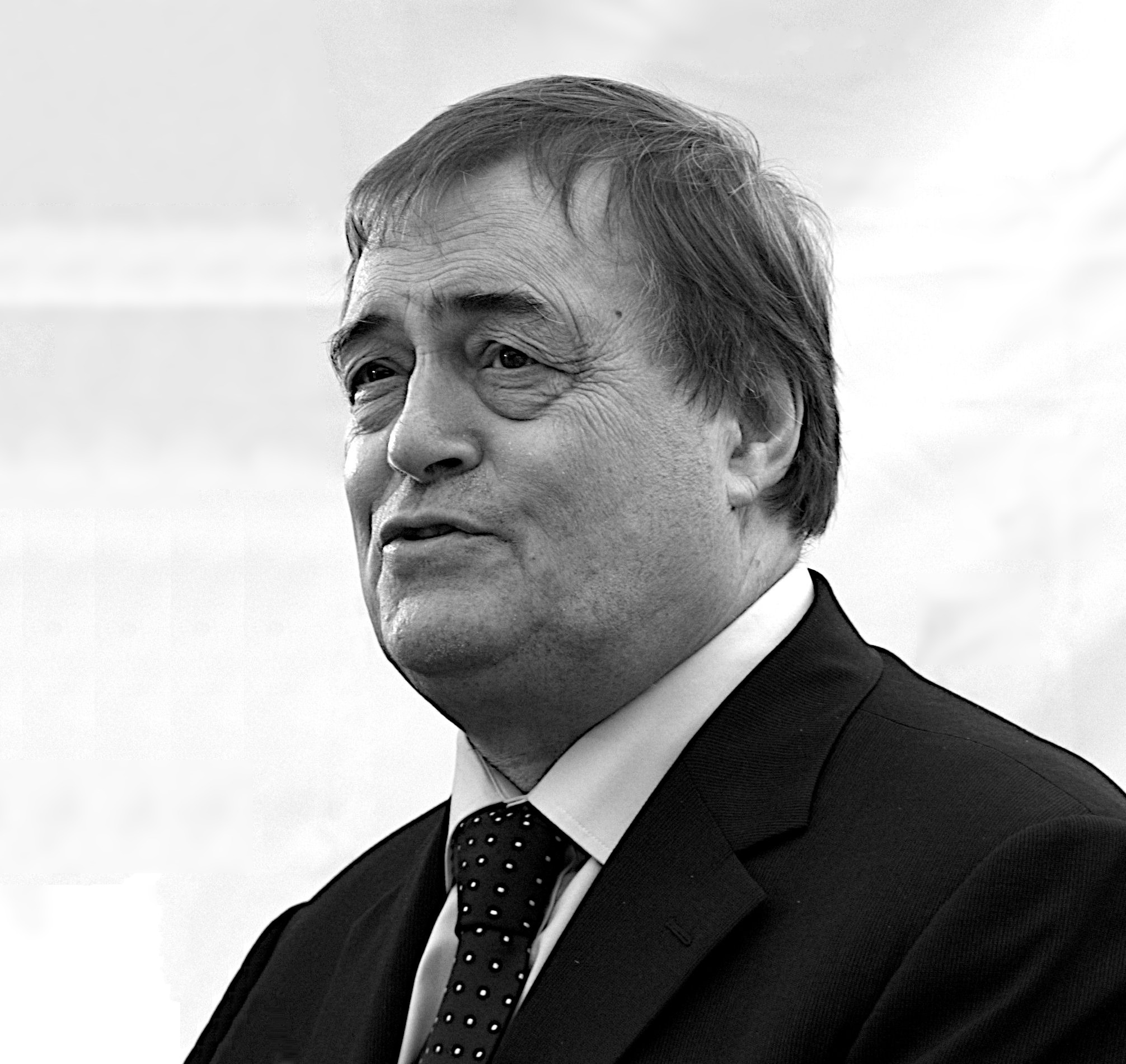
John Prescott, leading proponent of the assembly plans

In May 2002, the then Labour UK government published a white paper, Your Region, Your Choice, outlining its plans for the possible establishment of Elected Regional Assemblies. These assemblies were to be responsible for regional strategies dealing with sustainable development, economic development, spatial planning, transport, waste, housing, culture (including tourism) and biodiversity. They would be funded primarily by central government grant, with powers to raise additional funds from a precept (demand for payment) on the council tax.

The Assemblies were expected to be elected by an Additional Member System similar to those used for the London Assembly, the Scottish Parliament and the National Assembly for Wales. The Regional Assemblies (Preparations) Act 2003 made provisions for referendums to be held to create such assemblies, and to simplify the structure of local government where this is done. Three such referendums were planned, for the regions of North East and North West England and Yorkshire and the Humber.

On 12 February 2004, Local Government Minister Nick Raynsford announced that elected Assemblies would be able to direct local authorities to refuse strategic planning applications that are not in the region's best interest. They would be able to look across local boundary constraints and ensure planning decisions are made with region-wide interests taken into account. On 8 July 2004, it was announced that the referendums would be held on 4 November, but on 22 July Raynsford announced that only the North East England vote would go ahead on that date. This region was chosen because the government thought it was the most likely to approve the proposal.

However, the voters rejected the assembly by 696,519 votes to 197,310, or about 78 percent to 22 percent. This overwhelmingly negative vote was seen as an insurmountable obstacle to elected regional assemblies elsewhere in England outside London. On 8 November, Deputy Prime Minister John Prescott told the House of Commons he would not move orders for the other two regions within the effective time limit of June 2005 permitted by the Act.

The 'no' vote by the North East also affected the Labour Government's attempt to address the West Lothian question, because the government had canvassed regional assemblies as a partial solution to this anomaly.

=== Structure and powers of the proposed assemblies ===
The Deputy Prime Minister John Prescott presented a Draft Regional Assemblies Bill to Parliament in July 2004. The bill outlined the structure of the proposed assemblies and defined their powers.

The draft bill proposed the following structure:

- The assembly would be a body corporate with a distinct legal identity.
- Each assembly would be composed of between 25 and 35 assembly members elected by the Additional Member System.
- The assembly would select one member as the Chairman and another as Deputy Chairman to preside over its debates.
- The assembly would have an Executive (cabinet) composed of a Leader and between two and six Executive Members.

The draft bill would have given the assemblies the following powers:

- Promotion of economic development
- Promotion of social development
  - Promote health, safety and security of the community
  - Reduce health inequalities
  - Enhance individual participation in society
  - Improve the availability of good housing
  - Improve skills and the availability of training
  - Improve the availability of cultural and recreational activities
- Improvement and protection of the environment
- Additional functions and duties that the Secretary of State thinks appropriate

== Abolition and replacement ==
On 17 July 2007 the UK government published the Review of Sub-National Economic Development and Regeneration. The review brought forward the Government's plans to alter the structure of regional governance in England known as the Single Regional Strategy. The impact of the review was that the regional assemblies in their current form and function would not continue and that the regional development agencies were given executive responsibility for developing the single regional strategy.

The regional chambers were abolished between 2008 and 2010 with their executive functions transferring to the regional development agencies. Local authorities were given an increased role in scrutiny at the regional level including scrutiny of regional strategies and the RDAs through participation in new local authority leaders' boards which were established in each region. The two bodies would jointly produce new single regional strategies, with Ministers exercising an oversight function.

=== Local authority leaders' boards ===
Following the abolition of the regional chambers, smaller local authority leaders' boards took over responsibilities for scrutiny of RDAs and single regional plans.

The first local authority leaders' board, 4NW, was established in July 2008 and others were formed once the regional chamber for that region was abolished. By April 2010, eight leaders' boards had been established. In June 2010, the new Conservative-Liberal Democrat coalition government announced plans to remove funding from the new boards and to remove their statutory functions. The boards may continue as voluntary associations of council leaders. Regional development agencies were abolished on 31 March 2012, with their functions being taken over by smaller local enterprise partnerships which are not based on regional boundaries. LEPs were themselves phased out in April 2024.

== Alternative arrangements ==
=== Cornish Assembly ===
In Cornwall, there was opposition to the South West Regional Assembly and the South West Regional Development Agency. A campaign for a Cornish Assembly had been running since July 2000, and attracted the support of a petition signed by 50,000 Cornish residents and visitors, which was presented to 10 Downing Street on 12 December 2001. The campaign had the support of all five Cornish Liberal Democrats MPs, Mebyon Kernow and others; they stated that the SW regional assembly was undemocratic and unaccountable, and believed Cornwall should be able to take decisions about local services in its own directly elected and accountable assembly.

=== Merseyside Assembly ===
In July 2004, five Merseyside MPs, led by George Howarth MP, launched a Manifesto for Merseyside which proposed a Merseyside Assembly, which would take a form similar to the existing London Assembly. As well as the five Merseyside boroughs, the proposals also included the Cheshire authorities of Halton and Ellesmere Port / Neston. The main argument was that the North West was too large and did not represent a cultural or economic area; something Merseyside did better.

=== City regions and combined authorities ===
Since the General Election in May 2005, the concept of city regions has gained currency in academic, policy and government circles, with several think tanks pushing the idea as a viable alternative to elected regional assemblies. However, opinion is divided on the question of whether to impose new city regional structures from above or to allow existing elected bodies to come together on a more informal voluntary basis.

=== Devolved English parliament ===
The Campaign for an English Parliament, the minor English Democrats party, and several Conservative Party MPs, see a devolved English parliament as another alternative to regional assemblies. They believe that rather than breaking up the historic nation of England, it should be preserved - with its own parliament similar to that of the Scottish Parliament - and that this is the only way the West Lothian question can be resolved while maintaining the United Kingdom.

== See also ==
- English votes for English laws
- Historical and alternative regions of England
- List of England-related topics
- Rule of the Major-Generals (1655–1657) under which England and Wales were divided into 10 administrative regions
- Regional ministers (2007–2010)
