= East of England Local Government Association =

- Abbreviation: EELGA
- Predecessor: East of England Regional Assembly
- Formation: April 2010
- Headquarters: West Suffolk House
- Location: Bury St Edmunds
- Region served: East of England
- Parent organisation: Local Government Association
- Website: www.localgoveasteng.gov.uk

The East of England Local Government Association (EELGA, operating under the name Local Government East) is an association of the 52 local authorities in the East of England. It is a regional grouping of the Local Government Association and the regional employers organisation. It was established in April 2010 following the abolition of the East of England Regional Assembly.

== History ==
=== Regional planning ===
From April 2010 the East of England Regional Strategy Board of the East of England Local Government Association was responsible, in cooperation with the East of England Development Agency, for strategic planning in the region. This role as a local authority leaders' board was established by the Local Democracy, Economic Development and Construction Act 2009. This role ended in 2010 with the abolition of statutory regional planning in England.

=== Economic development ===
In 2011 overlapping local enterprise partnerships were established covering the region:

- Greater Cambridge and Greater Peterborough (including Cambridgeshire and parts of Essex, Hertfordshire and Suffolk)
- Hertfordshire (Hertfordshire)
- New Anglia (Norfolk and Suffolk)
- South East (including Essex)
- South East Midlands (including Bedfordshire)

== Membership ==
There are 50 local authorities in the region, of which 11 are upper tier authorities:

- Bedford Borough Council (unitary)
- Cambridgeshire County Council and 5 district councils
- Central Bedfordshire Council (unitary)
- Essex County Council and 12 district councils
- Hertfordshire County Council and 10 district councils
- Luton Borough Council (unitary)
- Norfolk County Council and 7 district councils
- Peterborough City Council (unitary)
- Southend-on-Sea City Council (unitary)
- Suffolk County Council and 5 district councils
- Thurrock Council (unitary)
