= East of England =

Region of England

- Region
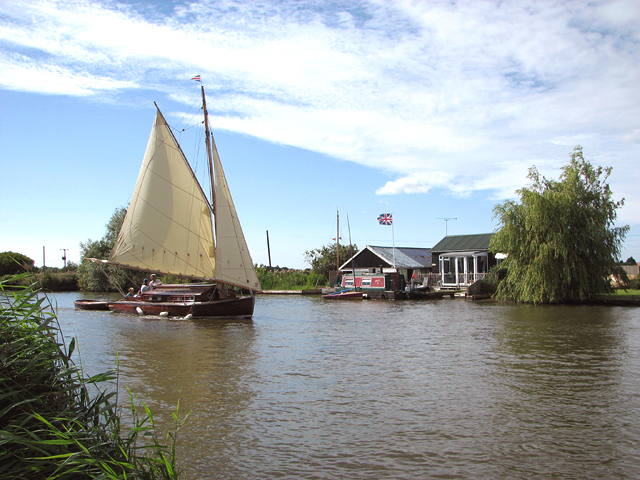
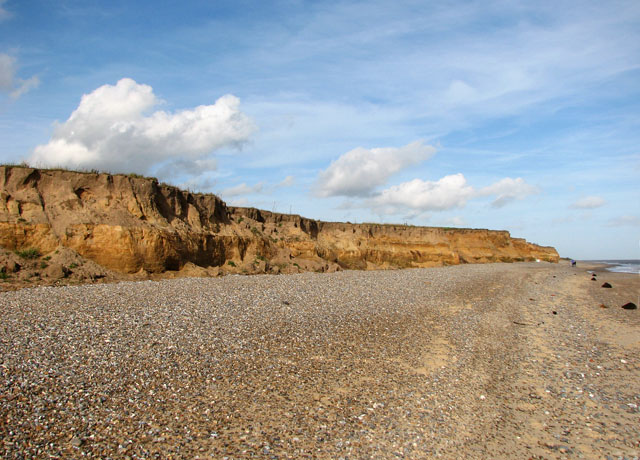
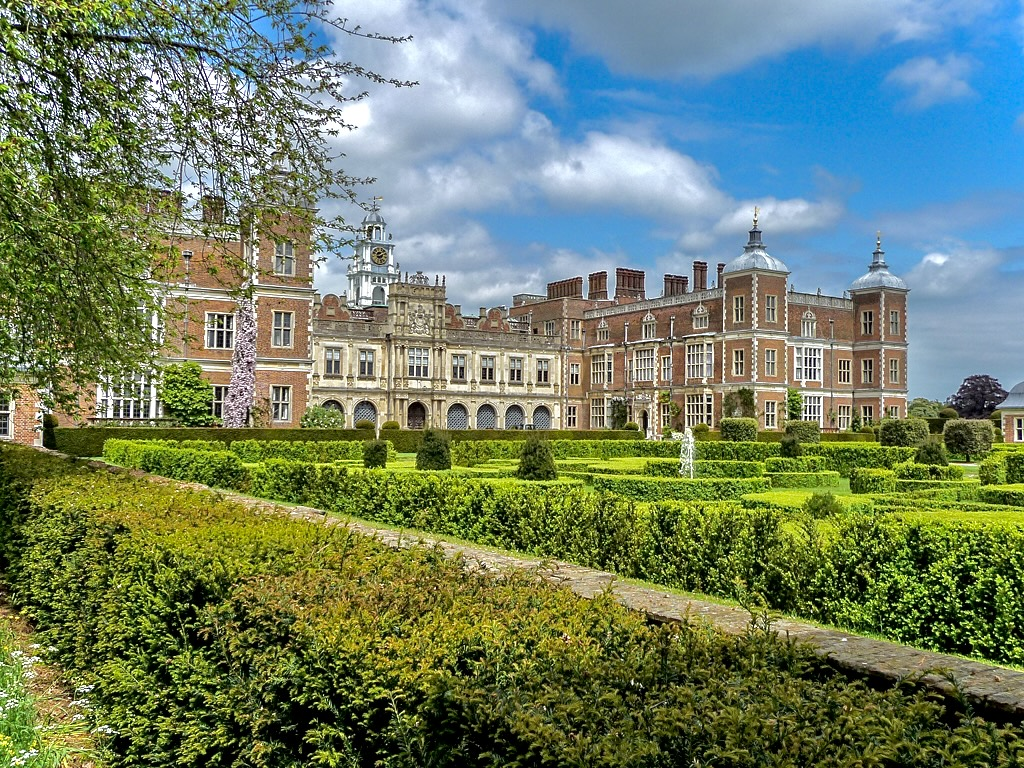
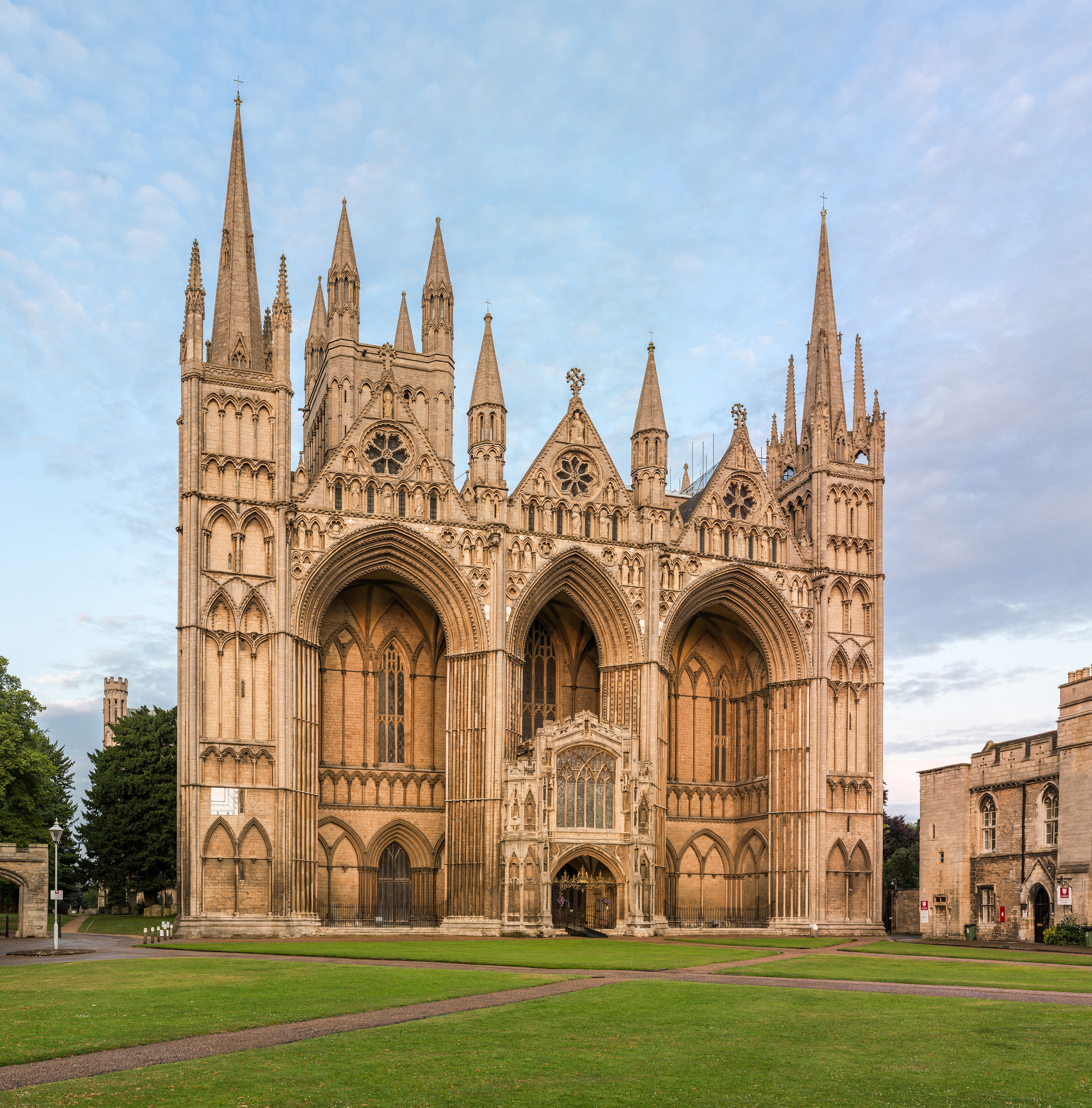
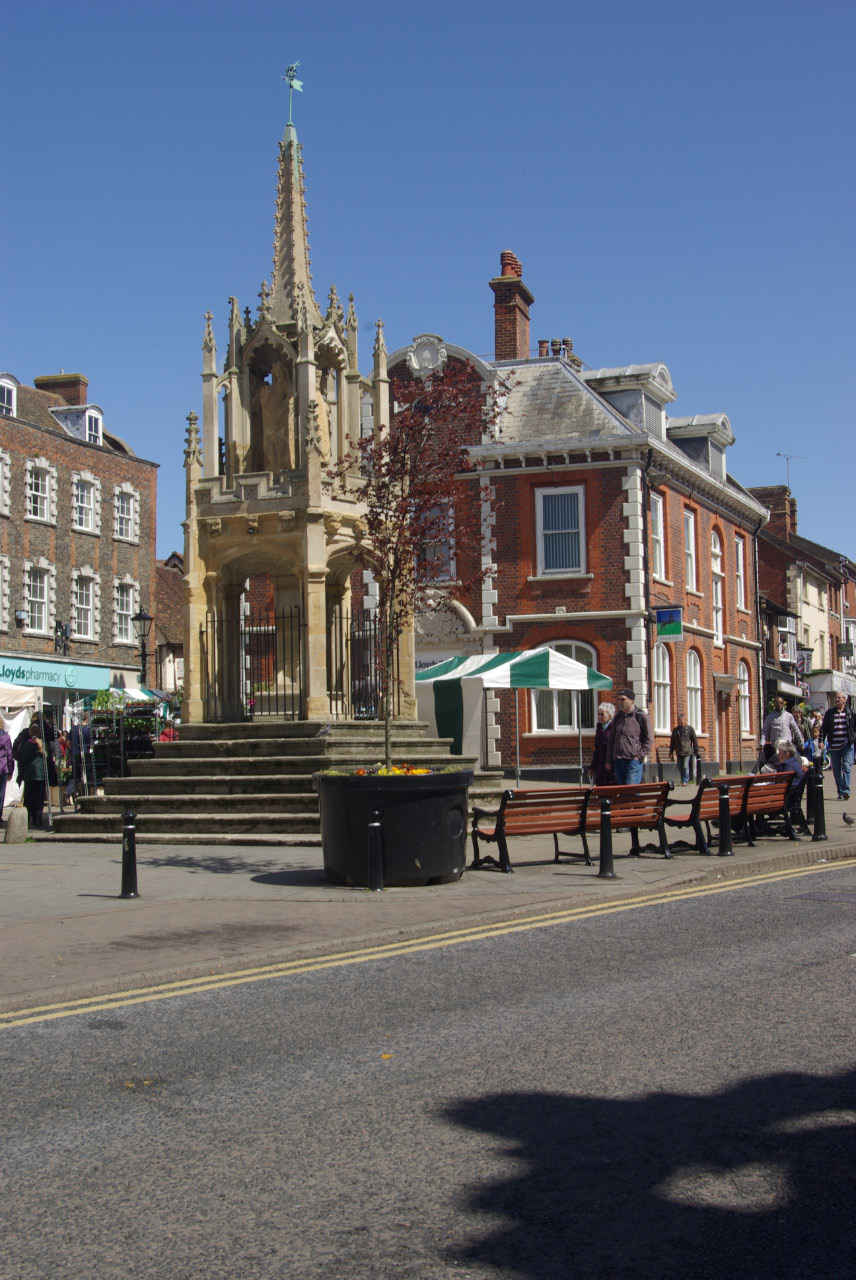
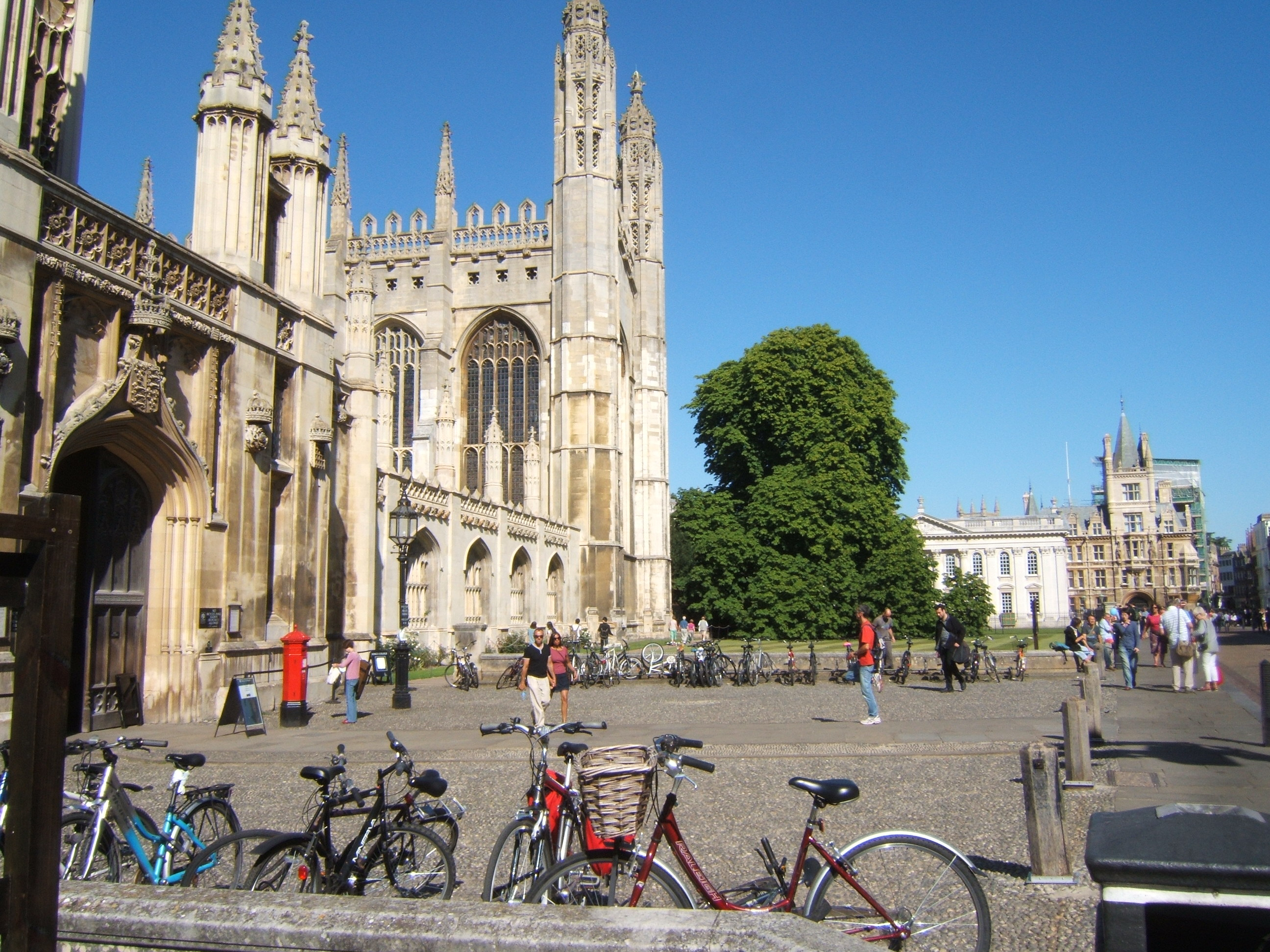
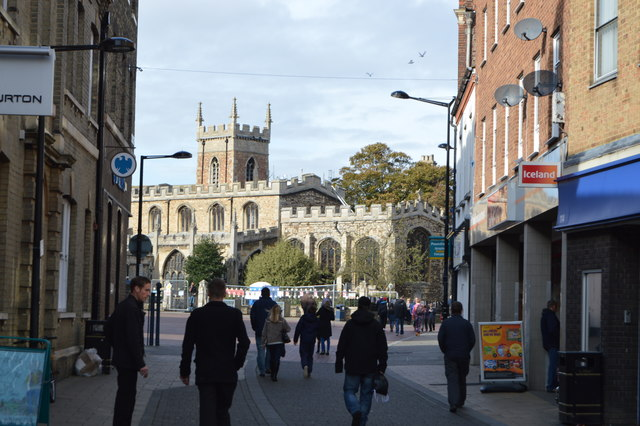
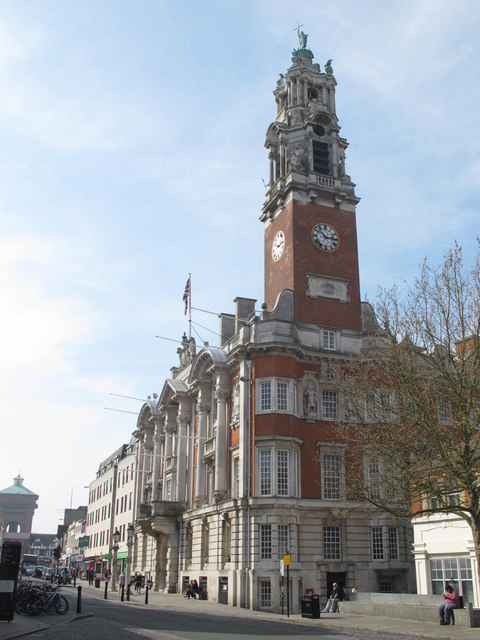
- From top, left to right: Norfolk Broads; Suffolk Coast; Hatfield House; Peterborough; Leighton Buzzard; Cambridge; Huntingdon; Colchester

- East of England region shown within England
- Coordinates: 52.24°N 0.41°E
- Sovereign state: United Kingdom
- Country: England
- GO established: 1994
- RDA established: 1998
- GO abolished: 2011
- RDA abolished: 31 March 2012
- Largest city: Peterborough
- Subdivisions: 6 counties: Bedfordshire; Cambridgeshire; Essex; Hertfordshire; Norfolk; Suffolk; 1 combined authority: Cambridgeshire and Peterborough; 45 districts: 6 unitary; 39 non-metropolitan districts in 5 non-metropolitan counties

Government
  - Type: Local authority leaders' board
  - Body: East of England Local Government Association
  - MPs: 61 MPs (of 650)

Area
  - Total: 7,563 sq mi (19,587 km^{2})
  - Land: 7,381 sq mi (19,116 km^{2})
  - Rank: 2nd

Population (2025)
  - Total: 6,613,801
  - Rank: 4th
  - Density: 900/sq mi (346/km^{2})

Ethnicity (2021)
  - Ethnic groups: List: 86.5% White; 6.4% Asian; 2.9% Black; 2.8% Mixed; 1.4% other

Religion (2021)
  - Religion: List: 46.6% Christianity; 40.2% no religion; 3.7% Islam; 1.4% Hinduism; 0.7% Judaism; 0.4% Sikhism; 0.4% Buddhism; 0.6% other; 6.1% not stated
- Time zone: UTC+0 (GMT)
  - Summer (DST): UTC+1 (BST)
- ITL code: TLH
- GSS code: E12000006

The East of England is one of nine official regions of England at the first level of ITL for statistical purposes. (Note: ITL replaced NUTS and followed the same definitions of its predecessor until 2023) It consists of the ceremonial counties of Bedfordshire, Cambridgeshire, Essex, Hertfordshire, Norfolk and Suffolk. The northern part of the region, consisting of Norfolk, Suffolk, and sometimes Cambridgeshire, is known as East Anglia. The latter region has been considered an informal region in its own right due to its differing cultural identity, although some use of the term has covered all of the East of England.

The population of the East of England in 2025 was 6,613,801. Bedford, Luton, Basildon, Peterborough, Southend-on-Sea, Norwich, Ipswich, Colchester, Chelmsford and Cambridge are the most populous settlements. Peterborough is the largest city in the East of England at 215,000. The southern part of the region lies in the London commuter belt.

== Geography ==
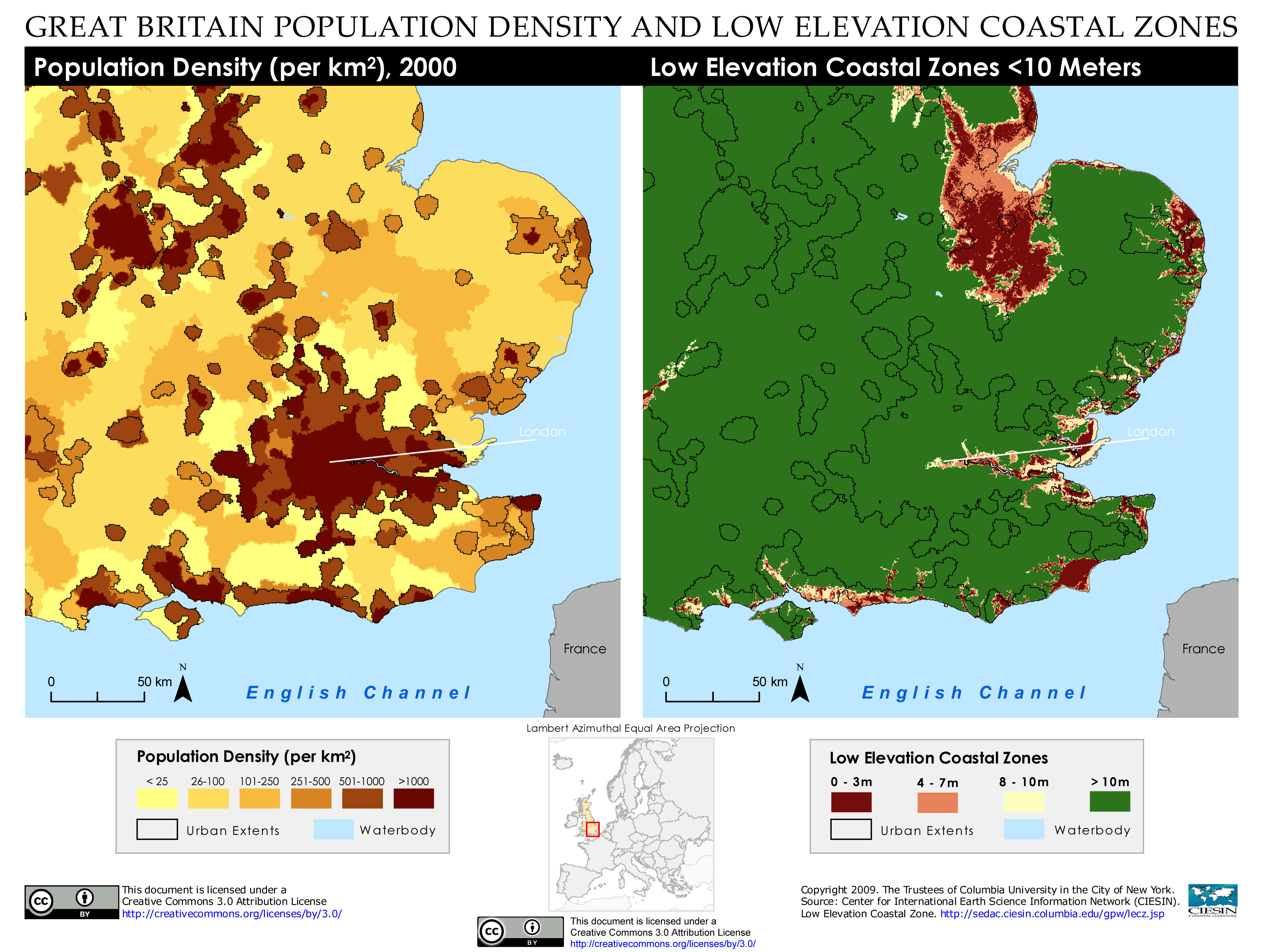
England population density and low elevation coastal zones. East of England is particularly vulnerable to sea level rise.

The East of England has the lowest elevation range in the UK. Twenty per cent of the region is below mean sea level, most of this in North Cambridgeshire, Norfolk and on the Essex Coast. Most of the remaining area is of low elevation, with extensive glacial deposits. The Fens, a large area of reclaimed marshland, are mostly in North Cambridgeshire. The Fens include the lowest point in the country in the village of Holme: 2.75 metres (9.0 ft) below mean sea level. This area formerly included the body of open water known as Whittlesey Mere. The highest point in the region is at Clipper Down at 817 ft (249 m) above mean sea level, in the far southwestern corner of the region in the Ivinghoe Hills.

Communities known as New Towns, responses to urban congestion and World War II destruction, appeared in Basildon and Harlow (Essex), as well as in Stevenage and Hemel Hempstead (Hertfordshire), in the 1950s and 1960s. In the late 1960s, the Roskill Commission considered Cublington in Buckinghamshire, Thurleigh in Bedfordshire, Nuthampstead in Hertfordshire and Foulness in Essex as locations for a possible third airport for London. A new airport was not built, but a former Royal Air Force base at Stansted, which had previously been converted to civilian use redeveloped and expanded in the following decades.

=== Historical use ===
The East of England succeeded the standard statistical region East Anglia (which excluded Essex, Hertfordshire and Bedfordshire, then in the South East). The East of England civil defence region was identical to today's region.

=== East Anglia with home counties ===
Essex, despite meaning East-Saxons, previously formed part of the South East England administrative region, along with Bedfordshire and Hertfordshire, a mixture of definite and debatable home counties. The earliest use of the term is from 1695. Charles Davenant, in An essay upon ways and means of supplying the war, wrote, "The Eleven Home Counties, which are thought in Land Taxes to pay more than their proportion..." then cited a list including these four. The term does not appear to have been used in taxation since the 18th century.

== Climate ==
East Anglia is one of the driest parts of the United Kingdom, with average rainfall ranging from 450 to 750 mm (18 to 30 in). The area receives such low rainfall amounts because low pressure systems and weather fronts from the Atlantic lose a lot of moisture over land (and therefore are usually much weaker) by the time they reach Eastern England.

Winter (mid-November – mid-March) is mostly cool, but non-prevailing cold easterly winds can affect the area from the continent. These can bring heavy snowfall if the winds interact with a low-pressure system over the Atlantic or France. Northerly winds also can be cold but are not usually as cold as easterly winds. Westerly winds bring milder and, typically, wetter weather. Southerly winds usually bring mild air (if from the Atlantic or North Africa) but chill if coming from further east than Spain.

Spring (mid-March – May) is a transitional season that initially can be chilly but is usually warm by late-April/May. The weather at this time is often changeable (within each day) and occasionally showery.

Summer (June – mid-September) is usually warm. Continental air from mainland Europe or the Azores High usually leads to at least a few weeks of hot, balmy weather with prolonged warm to hot temperatures. The number of summer storms from the Atlantic, such as the remnants of a tropical storm, usually coincides with the location of the jet stream. The East tends to receive much less rain than the other regions.

Autumn (mid-September – mid-November) is usually mild with some days being very unsettled and rainy and others warm. At least part of September and early October in the East have warm and settled weather, but only in rare years is there an Indian summer where fine weather marks the entire traditional harvest season.

Dust devils were reported in Essex and Cambridgeshire on 17 August 2024, causing minor injuries and some disruption. These small whirlwinds, which form from the ground up, are less powerful than tornadoes. In Essex, they caused tents and gazebos to be lifted during a local event, resulting in minor injuries. Witnesses described the event as unexpected, noting that such phenomena are rare in the area.

== Demographics ==
Population map.

Total East of England population (wikidata:Q48006) = 5,907,300 (2012 estimation)
(WD = Wikidata page)

[Hide/show county populations]
	East of England	pop.
1	Bedfordshire	682,311^{WD}
2	Essex	1,859,800^{WD}
3	Hertfordshire	1,195,672^{WD}
4	Norfolk	914,039^{WD}
5	Suffolk	758,556^{WD}

East of England population pyramid in 2020

=== Ethnicity ===
Ethnic group	Year							
Ethnic group	1991		2001		2011		2021	
Ethnic group	Number	%	Number	%	Number	%	Number	%
White: Total	4,891,675	96.8%	5,125,003	95.11%	5,310,194	90.81%	5,478,364	86.5%
White: British			4,927,343	91.44%	4,986,170	85.27%	4,972,149	78.5%
White: Irish			61,208		55,573		57,964	0.9%
White: Irish Traveller/Gypsy			-	-	8,165		8,977	0.1%
White: Roma							9,675	0.2%
White: Other			136,452		260,286		429,599	6.8%
Asian or Asian British: Total	99,720	2%	142,137	2.63%	278,372	4.76%	405,869	6.5%
Asian or Asian British: Indian	39,292		51,035		86,736		136,974	2.2%
Asian or Asian British: Pakistani	24,713		38,790		66,270		99,452	1.6%
Asian or Asian British: Bangladeshi	10,934		18,503		32,992		50,685	0.8%
Asian or Asian British: Chinese	12,494		20,385		33,503		38,444	0.6%
Asian or Asian British: Asian Other	12,287		13,424		58,871		80,314	1.3%
Black or Black British: Total	42,310	0.8%	48,464	0.89%	117,442	2%	184,949	3%
Black or Black British: African	6,373		16,968		69,925		118,731	1.9%
Black or Black British: Caribbean	21,892		26,199		33,614		41,884	0.7%
Black or Black British: Other	14,045		5,297		13,903		24,334	0.4%
Mixed: Total			57,984	1.07%	112,116	1.91%	179,654	2.8%
Mixed: White and Caribbean			19,882		37,222		51,950	0.8%
Mixed: White and African			6,109		15,388		27,376	0.4%
Mixed: White and Asian			17,385		32,226		51,448	0.8%
Mixed: Other Mixed			14,608		27,280		48,880	0.8%
Other: Total	21,810	0.4%	14,552	0.27%	28,841	0.49%	86,232	1.3%
Other: Arab			-	-	10,367		15,639	0.2%
Other: Any other ethnic group	21,810	0.4%	14,552		18,474		70,593	1.1%
Total	5,055,515	100%	5,388,140	100%	5,846,965	100%	6,335,068	100%

=== Religion ===
Religion in the East of England
Religion	2021		2011		2001	
Religion	Number	%	Number	%	Number	%
Christianity	2,955,071	46.6%	3,488,063	59.7%	3,886,778	72.1%
Islam	234,744	3.7%	148,341	2.5%	78,931	1.5%
Hinduism	86,631	1.4%	54,010	0.9%	31,386	0.6%
Judaism	42,012	0.7%	34,830	0.6%	30,367	0.6%
Buddhism	26,814	0.4%	22,273	0.4%	12,065	0.2%
Sikhism	24,284	0.4%	18,213	0.3%	13,365	0.2%
Other religion	36,380	0.6%	24,981	0.4%	15,471	0.3%
No religion	2,544,509	40.2%	1,631,572	27.9%	902,145	16.7%
Religion not stated	384,627	6.1%	424,682	7.3%	417,632	7.8%
Total population	6,335,072	100%	5,846,965	100%	5,388,140	100%

== Politics ==
=== Elections ===
General Election results in 2017

In the 2015 general election there was an overall swing of 0.25% from the Conservatives to Labour and the Liberal Democrats lost 16% of its vote. All of Hertfordshire and Suffolk became Conservative. The region's electorate voted 49% Conservative, 22% Labour, 16% UKIP, 8% Liberal Democrat and 4% Green. Like other regions, the division of seats favours the dominant party in the region and the Conservatives had 52, Labour 4 (Cambridge, Luton South, Luton North and Norwich South), UKIP 1 (Clacton) and 1 Liberal Democrat (North Norfolk).

In the 2019 United Kingdom general election, the Conservatives gained Peterborough and Ipswich from Labour. They also gained North Norfolk from the Liberal Democrats but lost St Albans to Daisy Cooper.

Number of MPs returned per party, total 59 (situation at end of parliament in brackets)
Affiliation	2010–15	2015–17	2017–19	2019–24	2024–present
Labour Party	2	4	7 (5)	5 (7)	27
Conservative Party	52	52	50 (46)	52 (51)	23
Liberal Democrats	4	1	1 (2)	1	7
Reform UK				0	3
Green	0	0	0	0	1
The Independents	0	0	0 (1)	0	0
Independent	0	1	0 (4)	0	0

== Governance and regions ==
=== East of England Plan ===
The East of England Plan, a revision of the Regional Spatial Strategy for the East of England, was published on 12 May 2008. It was revoked on 3 January 2013.

=== Local government ===
The official region consists of the following subdivisions:

Map	Ceremonial county	Shire county / unitary	Districts
	Essex	1. Thurrock U.A.	
	Essex	2. Southend-on-Sea U.A.	
	Essex	3. Essex	a) Harlow, b) Epping Forest, c) Brentwood, d) Basildon, e) Castle Point, f) Rochford, g) Maldon, h) Chelmsford, i) Uttlesford, j) Braintree, k) Colchester, l) Tendring
	4. Hertfordshire		a) Three Rivers, b) Watford, c) Hertsmere, d) Welwyn Hatfield, e) Broxbourne, f) East Hertfordshire, g) Stevenage, h) North Hertfordshire, i) St Albans, j) Dacorum
	Bedfordshire	5. Luton U.A.	
	Bedfordshire	6. Bedford U.A.	
	Bedfordshire	7. Central Bedfordshire U.A.	
	Cambridgeshire	8. Cambridgeshire	a) Cambridge, b) South Cambridgeshire, c) Huntingdonshire, d) Fenland, e) East Cambridgeshire
	Cambridgeshire	9. Peterborough U.A.	
	10. Norfolk		a) Norwich, b) South Norfolk, c) Great Yarmouth, d) Broadland, e) North Norfolk, f) Breckland, g) King's Lynn and West Norfolk
	11. Suffolk		a) Ipswich, b) East Suffolk, c) Babergh, d) Mid Suffolk, e) West Suffolk

=== 2010 Eurostat NUTS ===
In the Eurostat Nomenclature of Territorial Units for Statistics (NUTS), the East of England was a level-1 NUTS region, coded "UKH", which was subdivided as follows:

NUTS 1	Code	NUTS 2	Code	NUTS 3	Code
East of England	UKH	East Anglia	UKH1	Peterborough	UKH11
		East Anglia	UKH1	Cambridgeshire CC	UKH12
		East Anglia	UKH1	Norfolk	UKH13
		East Anglia	UKH1	Suffolk	UKH14
		Bedfordshire and Hertfordshire	UKH2	Luton	UKH21
		Bedfordshire and Hertfordshire	UKH2	Hertfordshire CC	UKH23
		Bedfordshire and Hertfordshire	UKH2	Bedford	UKH24
		Bedfordshire and Hertfordshire	UKH2	Central Bedfordshire	UKH25
		Essex	UKH3	Southend-on-Sea	UKH31
		Essex	UKH3	Thurrock	UKH32
		Essex	UKH3	Essex CC	UKH33

After the UK's departure from the EU, the UK NUTS regions were renamed as International Territorial Level regions in 2021.

=== 2025 ITL ===
Since 2025, the East of England is subdivided statistically, into five ITL 2 areas, each sub-divided into multiple ITL 3 areas, which are as follows:

- Bedfordshire and Hertfordshire
  - Bedford
  - Central Bedfordshire
  - Luton
  - North and East Hertfordshire
  - South West Hertfordshire
- Cambridgeshire and Peterborough
  - Cambridgeshire CC
  - Peterborough
- Essex
  - Essex Haven Gateway
  - Essex Thames Gateway
  - Heart of Essex
  - Southend-on-Sea
  - Thurrock
  - West Essex
- Norfolk
  - Breckland and South Norfolk
  - North and West Norfolk
  - Norwich and East Norfolk
- Suffolk
  - Babergh and Mid Suffolk
  - East Suffolk
  - Ipswich
  - West Suffolk

== History ==
=== Civil War and the Protectorate ===
The East of England was a major force and resource for Parliament and, in particular, in the form of the Eastern Association. Oliver Cromwell came from Huntingdon.

=== Second World War ===
Norfolk, Suffolk and Essex played host to the American VIII Bomber Command and Ninth Air Force. The Imperial War Museum at Duxford has an exhibition, commemorating their participation and sacrifice, near to the M11 south of Cambridge.

Stansted Airport was RAF Stansted Mountfitchet, home to the 344th Bombardment Group. The de Havilland Mosquito was mainly assembled at Hatfield and Leavesden, although much of the innovative wooden structure originated outside the region from the furniture industry of High Wycombe; the Mosquito entered service in 1942 with 105 Sqn at RAF Horsham St Faith. RAF Tempsford in Bedford is the airfield from where SOE secret agents for Europe took off, with 138 Sqn which parachuted agents and equipment and 161 Sqn which landed and retrieved agents. 19 Sqn at Duxford was the first to be equipped with the Spitfire on 4 August 1938.

=== Cold War ===
The 81st Tactical Fighter Wing was at RAF Bentwaters from January 1952 and also at RAF Woodbridge; in the late 1980s some of the aircraft went to RAF Alconbury. Alconbury closed in 1992 and Bentwaters closed in 1993, with the American air forces being in the area for 42 years; the USAF aircraft subsequently moved to Spangdahlem Air Base in Rhineland-Palatinate, Germany.

At RAF Marham in west Norfolk, 214 Sqn with the Vickers Valiant developed the RAF's refuelling system; later the squadron would be equipped with the Handley Page Victor. Work on refuelling had also taken place at RAF Tarrant Rushton in Dorset.

From the 1950s, RAF Wyton was an important reconnaissance base for the RAF, mainly 543 Sqn. The base is now home of the Defence Intelligence Fusion Centre, previously known as JARIC, or the Joint Air Reconnaissance Intelligence Centre from 1956.

=== Official region ===
The East of England region was officially created in 1994 and was adopted for statistics purposes from 1999.

== Healthcare ==
NHS East of England, which was the strategic health authority for the area until the abolition of these areas in 2013, is on Capital Park, next to Fulbourn Tesco, Fulbourn Hospital, and the Cambridge-Ipswich railway, on the eastern edge of Cambridge. The East of England Ambulance Service is on Cambourne Business Park on Cambourne, of the A428 (the former A45) west of Cambridge. The East Anglian Air Ambulance operates from Cambridge Airport and Norwich Airport; Essex Air Ambulance operates from Boreham.

== Economy ==
A profile of the economy of East of England in 2012

The former electricity company for the area, Eastern Electricity, has the area's distribution now looked after by UK Power Networks at Fore Hamlet in Ipswich. UK Power Networks also looks after London and most of the South-East. Business Link in the East of England is near to the headquarters of Ocado in Hatfield, at the roundabout of the A1057 and the A1001 on the Bishops Square Business Park. The region's Manufacturing Advisory Service is at Melbourn in Cambridgeshire, off the A10 and north of Royston. UK Trade & Investment for the region is in Histon with its international trade team based next to Magdalene College.

=== Hertfordshire ===
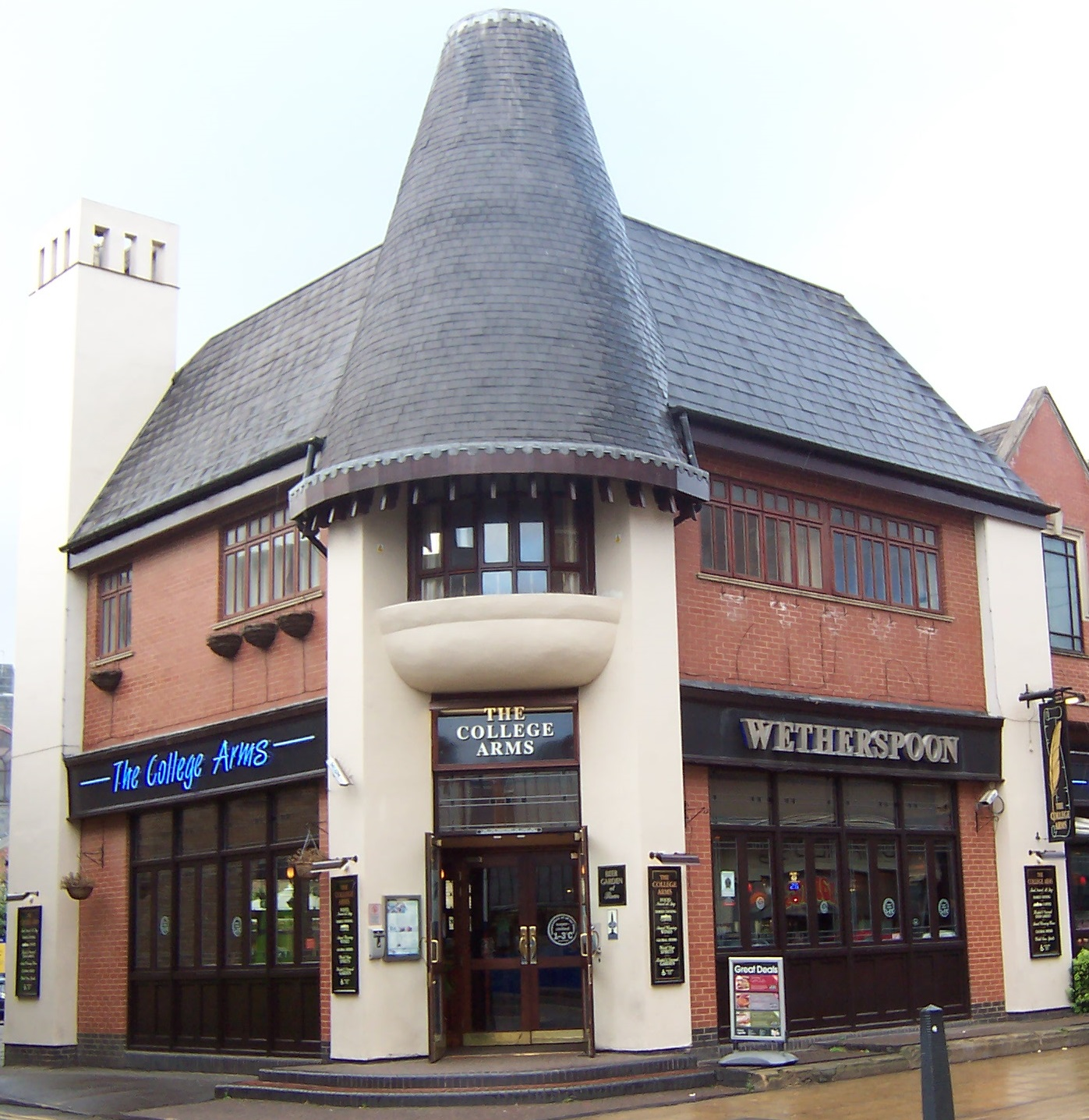
Wetherspoons is based in Watford near Watford Junction railway station

The Greater Watford area is home to British Waterways, Vinci (which bought Taylor Woodrow in 2008), the UK of the international firm Total Oil, retailers TK Maxx, Bathstore, Majestic Wine, Mothercare, Costco and Smiths Detection, Iveco, BrightHouse (at Abbots Langley), Leavesden Film Studios, Sanyo, Europcar, Olympus, Kenwood and Beko electronic goods manufacturers, Wetherspoons pub chains, the European HQ of the Hilton hotel group and Nestlé Waters; in Garston is the UK headquarters of the Seventh-day Adventist Church, on the A412 and the Building Research Establishment. Comet was previously, and Camelot Group (owners of the National Lottery) currently is, on the A4145, are in Rickmansworth. Ferrero (maker of Nutella and Kinder Chocolate) is in Croxley Green. Renault and Skanska (construction) are in Maple Cross.

=== Bedfordshire ===
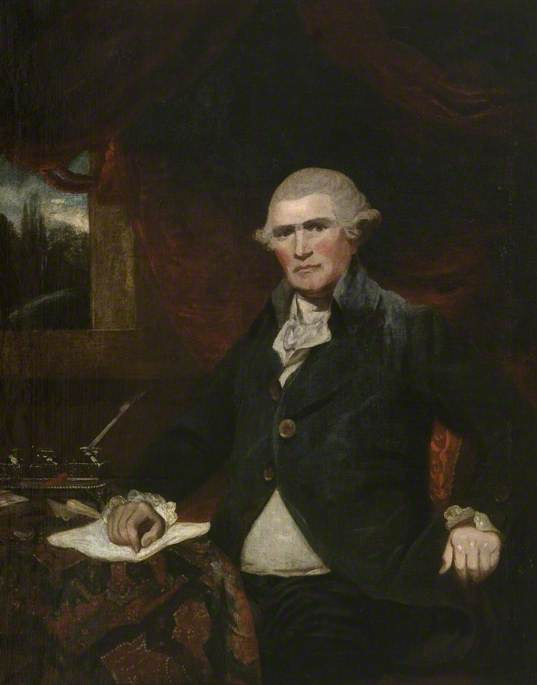
Samuel Whitbread began his brewery in Bedfordshire in 1742

Moto Hospitality has its headquarters at Toddington in Bedfordshire (at the Toddington services).

Luton is home to EasyJet,(based at the airport), Hain Celestial Group (which makes Linda McCartney Foods and is based on the B579 in Biscot), Thomson Holidays (based at Wigmore on the eastern edge of the town) and Chevrolet (at Griffin House, the Vauxhall head office). At the 85-acre Capability Green off the A1081 and junction 10a of the M1, is the Stonegate Pub Company (owner of Scream Pubs, Yates's, Slug and Lettuce and Hogshead), InBev UK (which bought most of Whitbread's beer brands), Chargemaster (electric vehicle network under the POLAR brand), AstraZeneca's UK Marketing Company division and Alexon Group (ladies clothing). Vauxhall produced its last Vectra in March 2002 at its Luton plant near the A6/A505 roundabout. Since then, the company has focused on van production, primarily the Vivaro (also sold as the Renault Trafic and other variants), at the former Bedford Vehicles site in the north of the town.

=== East Anglia ===
Flag of East Anglia

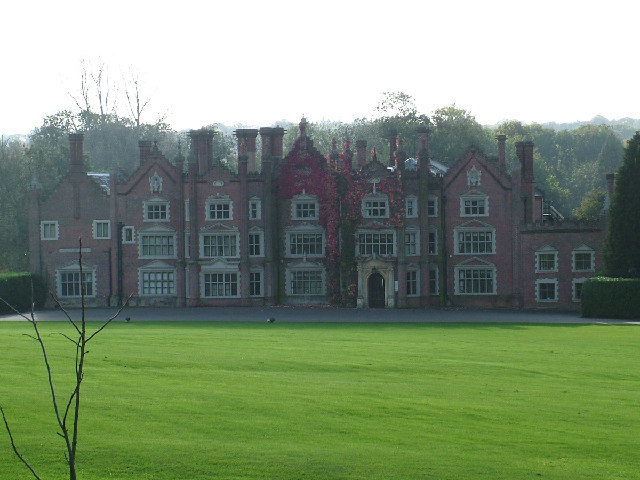
Great Witchingham Hall, the headquarters of Bernard Matthews Farms, north-west of Norwich at Great Witchingham on the A1067

The economy in Norfolk, Cambridgeshire and Suffolk is traditionally mostly agricultural. Norfolk is the UK's biggest producer of potatoes. Nationally known companies include the RAC, Archant (publishing), Virgin Money and Aviva (formerly Norwich Union) in Norwich. In Carrow, to the east of the city, Colman's makes a wide range of mustards, and Britvic makes Robinsons squash, which was owned by Colman's until 1995. Across the River Yare near the A47/A146 junction in Trowse with Newton is May Gurney, the construction company. Bernard Matthews Farms has a large turkey farm on the former RAF Attlebridge in Weston Longville. Campbell Soup was made in Kings Lynn until 2008, and on the Hardwick Industrial Estate at the A47/A149 junction is PinguinLutosa the UK, which packs frozen vegetables, and Caithness Crystal.

Foster Refrigerator is the UK's leading manufacturer of commercial refrigerators and blast chillers, owned by Illinois Tool Works, based on the industrial estate; with Multitone Electronics, which has a manufacturing plant there, and which invented the pager in 1956, for St Thomas' Hospital; and Snap-on Diagnostics makes diagnostic tools for garages. British Sugar's Wissington is the world's largest sugar beet factory in Methwold, on the B1160 near the River Wissey. Lotus Cars and Team Lotus are on the eastern edge of the former RAF Hethel, east of Wymondham (A11) at Hethel (Bracon Ash). Jeyes Group makes household chemicals in Thetford, off the A134; Multiyork makes furniture and Baxter Healthcare has a manufacturing plant in the south of the town. Aunt Bessie vegetable products (roast potatoes) are made by Heinz at Westwick, in a factory built by Ross Group.

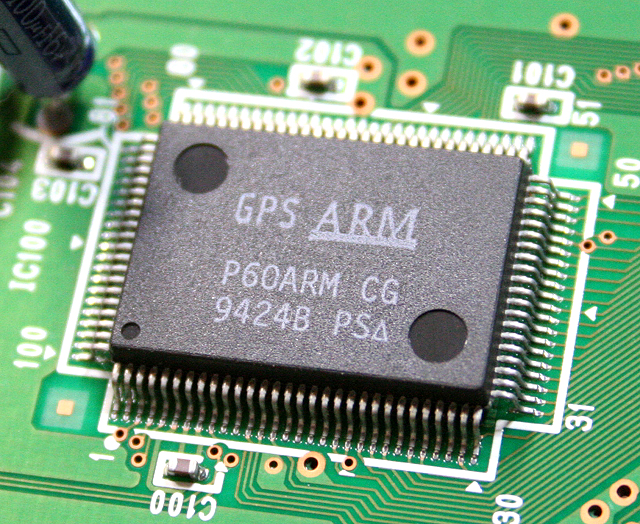
ARM CPU designed in Cambridge

Around Cambridge on numerous science parks, are high technology (electronics and biochemistry) companies, such as ARM Holdings on Peterhouse Technology Park in the south-east of the town, Adder Technology (KVM switches) at Bar Hill at the A14/B1050 junction north of the town, Monsanto, Play.com on the Cambridge Business Centre. The Wellcome Trust Genome Campus has the European Bioinformatics Institute at Hinxton east of Duxford near the M11 spur for the A11. These form the so-called Silicon Fen. Marshall Aerospace is at Cambridge Airport on the A1303 in the east of the town, towards Teversham. South of the airport, Carl Zeiss NTS makes scanning electron microscopes in Cherry Hinton. Syngenta is to the east of Cambridge, on Capital Park at Fulbourn. Premier Foods has a large plant in Histon making Robertson's and Hartley's jam, Gale's honey, Smash instant potato, and Rose's marmalade. Addenbrooke's Hospital is a pioneering hospital in the UK, based at Cambridge Biomedical Campus.

=== Universities ===
The most famous university in the region is the University of Cambridge. The university has been officially rated as the best in the world in 2010. It has the second-best medicine course in the world, and in 2010 became the only university outside of the US to raise over £1 billion in charitable donations.

There are eight universities in the region. Cambridge hosts two universities: the University of Cambridge and Anglia Ruskin University. It is also the home of the Open University's East of England branch. Norwich also hosts two universities: the University of East Anglia and Norwich University of the Arts. There are also other towns and cities in the region which have universities including Bedford and Luton (University of Bedfordshire), Colchester (University of Essex) and Hatfield (University of Hertfordshire). Other higher education centres in the region include University Centre Peterborough, University of Suffolk and Writtle College.

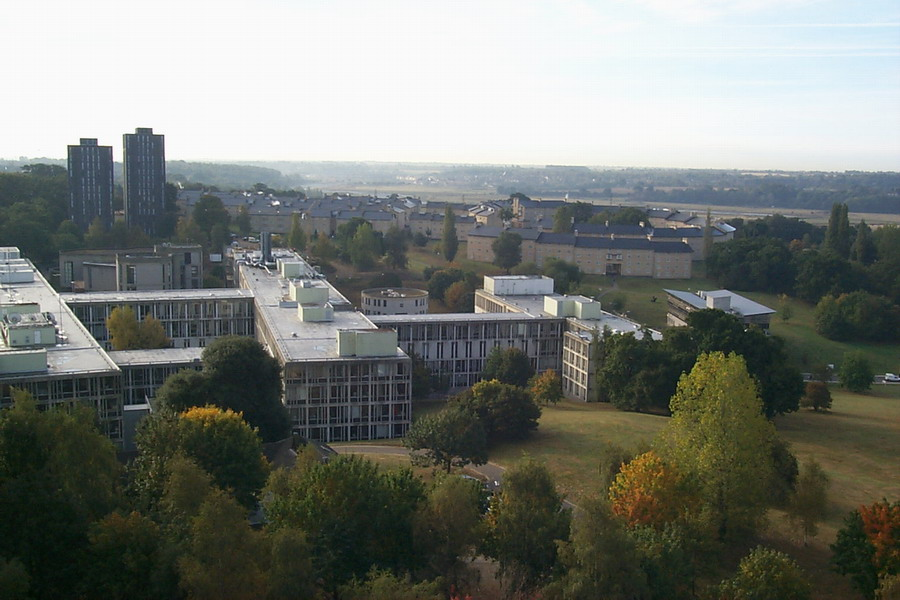
University of Essex near Colchester

The University of Cambridge receives almost three times as much funding as any other university in the region, due to its huge research grant—the largest in England (and the UK). The next largest, by funding, is UEA in Norwich. The University of Essex and Cranfield University also have moderately large research grants, but no other universities in the region do. The largest university by student numbers is ARU, and the next biggest is Cambridge. The smallest is Essex.

For total income to universities, Cambridge receives around £1 billion—around six times larger than any other university in the region. The University of Bedfordshire receives the least income. Cambridge has the lowest drop-out (discontinuation) rate in the region. Once graduated, over 50% of students stay in the region, with 25% going to London and 10% going to the South East. Very few go elsewhere—especially the North of England.

== Sport ==
=== Football ===
During the nineteenth century, several formulations of the laws of football, known as the Cambridge rules, were created by students at the university. One of these codes, dating from 1863, had a significant influence on the creation of the original laws of The Football Association.

East of England's top representatives in the English football league system today are Ipswich Town, Norwich City, Watford and Luton Town, who have competed in the top flight at various points. Alongside teams Peterborough United, and Cambridge United.

=== Netball ===
London Mavericks, previously Hertfordshire Mavericks and Saracens Mavericks, have competed in the Netball Super League since 2005. The franchise represents the East region and plays a number of home fixtures at the University of Hertfordshire sports village and the Brentwood Centre. Mavericks have appeared in the Netball Super League Grand Final seven times, winning the title in both 2008 and 2011.

Turnford Netball Club, Norfolk United Netball Club and Hatfield Netball Club are all teams from the East region which play in the England Netball Premier League, the highest level of club/amateur netball in the country.

== Literature ==
Children's author Dodie Smith lived near the town of Sudbury in Suffolk, and part of her famous novel The Hundred and One Dalmatians which inspired the Disney animated film of the same name takes place in the town at St Peter's Church.

== Media ==
=== Television ===
Much of the region receives the BBC East and ITV Anglia television services, both based in Norwich (the BBC moving from All Saints' Green to The Forum in 2003, and Anglia remaining at its original base, Angia House.) These services broadcast from the Sandy Heath, Sudbury and Tacolneston transmitter groups. Some areas in close proximity to London, including Luton and south Essex, may receive their service from BBC London and ITV London; in addition, the Hemel Hempstead relay transmitter is a relay of the London services from Crystal Palace, bringing London television into parts of Hertfordshire. Northwestern parts of Norfolk including Kings Lynn receive a better TV signal from the Belmont transmitter that broadcast BBC East Yorkshire and Lincolnshire and ITV Calendar. Some editions of Look East and ITV News Anglia broadcast split news programming for the West (Home Counties) and East (East Anglia/Essex) of the region, with the West subregions broadcasting from Sandy Heath; the BBC's Western opt-outs are broadcast from studios in Cambridge, also the base of BBC Radio Cambridgeshire, whilst both versions of the ITV Anglia output have broadcast from Anglia House in Norwich since the split service was introduced in 1990.

=== Radio ===
- BBC Local Radio services in the region include stations for Cambridgeshire, Essex, Norfolk, Suffolk and Three Counties Radio, which serves Hertfordshire, Bedfordshire and Buckinghamshire. Radio Cambridgeshire previously broadcast some split programming specific to the Peterborough area - at one point broadcasting this under the BBC Radio Peterborough name - but this opt-out was withdrawn in 2012 as a cost-cutting measure.

== See also ==
- East of England (European Parliament constituency)
- East of England Regional Strategy Board
- East of England Development Agency
- Regions of England
- East Anglia
- List of future transport developments in the East of England
- List of schools in the East of England
