= Proposed flag of North West England =

Proposed flag of English region

North West England (Proposed)
- Proportion: 3:5
- Adopted: Not adopted
- Designed by: Peter Saville

The Proposed Flag of North West England is an unofficial flag design which was created by graphic designer Peter Saville in 2004 following announcements by the British Government to put forward plans for the establishment of elected regional assemblies in England. The flag was supported by a pro-regionalist group, The Necessary Group which founded by Tony Wilson consisted of people who were in support of devolution in the North West.

== Description ==
The flag which is a distortion of the Flag of England highlights the upper left (North West) region and therefore supposedly represents the North West of England. Tony Wilson stated: "It's not about succession [sic], it's saying that there's this referendum about devolution", it was believed to highlight the issue of devolution in terms of regional identity by recalling the Manchester Peterloo Massacre in which the army charged a large political gathering and seized its flags.

Following a no vote in the North East of England for a regional assembly, a referendum vote for the North West, which was due to take place in October 2004, did not take place.
