= Local authority leaders' board =

Local authority leaders' boards are voluntary regional associations of council leaders that have been established in England outside of Greater London to replace certain functions of the now abolished regional chambers. The establishment of the boards was part of the UK Government's Review of Sub-National Economic Development and Regeneration. which brought forward the Government's plans to alter the structure of regional governance in England and was mandated by the Local Democracy, Economic Development and Construction Act 2009. In June 2010, the new Conservative-LibDem coalition government announced plans to remove funding from the new boards and to remove their statutory functions. It was indicated that the boards might continue as voluntary associations of council leaders.

The remaining four areas of the UK have similar voluntary or mandated associations: London Councils, the Welsh Local Government Association, the Convention of Scottish Local Authorities and the Northern Ireland Local Government Association.

== The local authority leaders' boards ==
Links to the leaders' boards

The leaders' boards are:

- East of England Local Government Association
- East Midlands Councils
- North East Regional Employers' Organisation
- North West Employers
- South East England Councils
- South West Councils
- West Midlands Employers
- Yorkshire and Humber Local Authority Employers' Association

Each leaders' board corresponds to a region of England.

== Structure and functions ==
When the regional chambers were abolished, their executive functions transferred to the regional development agencies, and their scrutiny functions became exercised by the new leader's boards. The RDA and the leader's board were to jointly produce a new Single Regional Strategy, with ministers exercising an oversight function.

The UK Government did not propose a set structure for the boards and each region was free to make its own arrangements. The Government however did aim for the boards to be:

- streamlined and manageable, able to make strategic, long-term decisions;
- representative of local authorities across the whole of their region — including representing key sub-regions, upper and lower tier authorities and the political balance of leaders;
- composed of local authority leaders and with sufficient authority to act on behalf of all the local authorities in the region.

=== Withdrawal of funding ===
In June 2010, the new Conservative-LibDem coalition government announced its intentions to abolish regional strategies and return spatial planning powers to local government. These plans include the withdrawal of funding to the existing eight local authority leaders' boards with their statutory functions also being assumed by local councils. The boards may continue to exist as voluntary associations of council leaders, funded by the local authorities themselves. They may continue to exist as regional groupings of the Local Government Association or as regional employers organisations.

== See also ==
- Regional employers organisations
- Regional development agency
- Regional spatial strategy
- Historical and alternative regions of England
- List of England-related topics
