= South West Regional Assembly =

Government body in England (1999–2008)

- Formation: 1999
- Dissolved: 2008
- Legal status: Regional chamber
- Region served: South West England

The South West Regional Assembly (SWRA) was the regional chamber for South West England, established in 1999. It was wound up in December 2008. Its functions were taken on by the South West Strategic Leaders' Board, the executive arm of the newly established South West Councils.

The SWRA covered an area of 23,829 square kilometres including Cornwall, Devon, Dorset, Gloucestershire, Somerset, Wiltshire and the Isles of Scilly, and represented a population of almost five million people. The South West Secretariat which supported the member organisations is based in Taunton, as is its successor body.

== Organisation ==
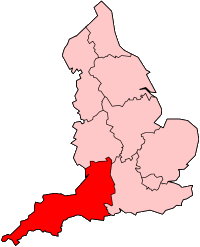
South West region within England

SWRA was not a directly elected body, but was a partnership of councillors from all local authorities in the region and representatives of various sectors with a role in the region's economic, social and environmental well-being. It was made up of 119 members, of which:

- 79 were appointed by the 51 Unitary, County and District Authorities in the South West. Membership was reviewed by local authorities every year, and changes reflected political proportionality across the region after local elections.
- 2 were appointed by the National Parks Authorities in the region.
- 2 were appointed by the Association of Local Councils.
- 36 were appointed by the region’s Social, Economic and Environmental Partners (SEEPs). The SEEPs were drawn from a range of sectors including businesses, the voluntary sector, education and training, environmental bodies, faith communities, trades unions, tourism, health, agriculture, Racial Equality Councils, co-operative agencies, Learning and Skills Councils, Business Links and Culture. The SEEP representatives were nominated by regional Groups and these were reviewed at least every four years, so the Membership was fairly fluid.

== Role ==
The main functions performed by the SWRA included:

- Channelling regional opinions to the business-led regional development agency,
- Carrying out advocacy and consultancy roles with national government bodies and the European Union,
- The Assembly was the Regional Planning Body with a duty to formulate a Regional Spatial Strategy,
- The Assembly was also the Regional Housing Body responsible for producing the Regional Housing Strategy (RHS).

== Opposition to SWRA ==
There was much opposition to the formation of the South West Regional Assembly with critics saying it was an unelected, unrepresentative and unaccountable quango, and the area covered was an artificially imposed region and not natural. This opinion was based upon geography, arguing that having the Isles of Scilly and Cornwall in the same region as Gloucestershire would be comparable to linking London with Yorkshire. The feeling was especially strong in Cornwall where in July 2000 Mebyon Kernow issued the "Declaration for a Cornish Assembly".

In October 2007 Lib Dem MP Andrew George stated in a press release, "Just because the Government has approached the whole Regional Devolution agenda in entirely the wrong way, does not mean to say that the project itself should be ditched. If Scotland and London are benefiting from devolution then Cornwall should learn from this and increase the intensity of its own campaign for devolution to a Cornish Assembly."

== Transfer of functions from the Regional Assembly ==
In July 2007, Local Government Minister John Healey MP announced Government plans to abolish regional assemblies. The functions of regional assemblies were planned to pass to regional development agencies in 2010.

The assembly's responsibilities for planning, housing and transport transferred to the Strategic Leaders' Board of South West Councils on 13 May 2009. The transfer followed agreement between the Assembly Leaders, the Strategic Leaders, the Social Economic and Environmental Partners and South West Councils. The outgoing Chairman of the Assembly, Sir Simon Day said:

"The assembly achieved a huge amount over the past few years and has risen to a number of difficult challenges. From our first successful lobbying activity for Objective 1 funding to encourage investment in Cornwall and Isle of Scilly, to backing the UK's Olympic Bid and the case to host the sailing event in the South West through to making make tough decisions on allocating funding for major transport and infrastructure, each challenge has require a grit and determination to achieve a regional consensus and provide a clear message to Government."

== See also ==
- South West of England Regional Development Agency
- Cornish self-government movement
