= CompeteFor =

UK government program

CompeteFor's homepage.

CompeteFor is a website set up by the Regional Development Agencies of the United Kingdom to facilitate the awarding of public contracts to business. The CompeteFor service was launched on January 17, 2008. The service is available to all businesses, but the emphasis is on the support of small and medium-sized enterprises (SMEs).

CompeteFor listed contract opportunities related to the London 2012 0lympics. More than 140,000 businesses were registered on the site by 2011.
