= Manufacturing Advisory Service =

- Abbreviation: MAS
- Formation: 1 April 2002; 24 years ago
- Type: Government agency
- Purpose: External technical and strategic advice for SME manufacturers in the UK
- Headquarters: Regional offices in the UK
- Region served: England and Scotland
- Members: 130 regional advisors
- Parent organisation: Department for Business, Innovation and Skills
- Affiliations: Department for Business, Innovation and Skills, Business Link
- Budget: £50 million (2012–2015)

The Manufacturing Advisory Service (MAS) is a former government agency in England and Scotland.

== History ==
It was founded by the Department of Trade and Industry (DTI, which became BERR in 2007) in April 2002. It was split into regions and was aimed at SMEs to offer technical and strategic advice. The regional offices were titled Regional Centres of Manufacturing Excellence. There was also co-operation with trade associations, research councils and university departments. In the first year the MAS had on average improved companies productivity by 30%, reduced waste by 37%, and increased inventory turnover by 90%. It had been launched with £27 million funding for three years. (50% Government and 50% Regional) The concept for MAS was based on US model the Manufacturing Extension Programme (MEP). A DTI official who had seen the programme in US brought the model back and developed it for the UK.

In many ways it is similar to what Business Link provides for all small businesses, except that Business Link may not have the in-depth experience of manufacturing, specifically the technical know-how. From November 2011 Business Link is mostly to be disbanded, due to abolishment of regional development agencies (RDAs), and replaced with regional websites. Much of Business Link's advice was previously via its extensive website. Like Business Link, MAS was funded through RDAs. Half of the MAS's funding came from its RDA and the other half came from BIS.

=== Overhaul ===
On 14 October 2011 Mark Prisk, a minister at the BIS, announced an overhaul of the MAS. It will offer much of what it has done, but due to the regional development agencies being abolished, it will be a national organisation from 1 January 2012. The new national programme will be delivered by the Manufacturing Advisory Consortium comprising Grant Thornton, Pera, WM Manufacturing Consortium Ltd, and SWMAS Ltd.

On 10 December 2010 he had announced that the MAS would not be abolished, as Business Link will be, but will have a 25% cut in funding. It is costing £20 million a year, which will be reduced to £15 million. For the last financial year Business Link received £190 million.

=== Closure ===
With no warning, on 27 November 2015, the closure of the Manufacturing Advisory Service was announced as part of the conservative government austerity programme, with the programme formally closing on 31 March 2016.

=== Relaunch ===
In April 2017 following a high-level meeting with a consortium of Manufacturing MD's and CEO's in Birmingham led by Lord Mike Whitby and Baroness Lorely Burt, Manufacturing Advisory Service was asked to be relaunched by voices from industry. No longer reliant on government funding, MAS through its place on the All Parliamentary Manufacturing Group and its operational delivery by the Made in Brand will continue to offer the signposting service of Manufacturing Advisory Service, but not a grant funding arm.

As a result, the re-launch of the Manufacturing Advisory Service is not like the old service in any way.

In October 2016, a further programme was created to fill the void left by MAS by providing access to specialist support, free advice and grant funding to help SME Manufacturers grow and improve their businesses. The Manufacturing Growth Programme, managed by those who ran the MAS programme for 10+ years across the West Midlands, East Midlands, Yorkshire and Humber, North West, and South regions, the new programme is also delivered by a number of previous MAS Advisors across 16 LEP regions who offer real advice and sustainable support.

The Manufacturing Growth Programme, is the new and only business support initiative to help support SME Manufacturers.

=== Manufacturing Growth Programme ===
In October 2016, SME Manufacturers were given a major boost with a new £9.7m business support initiative to support over 3,000 companies. Funded by ERDF and delivered by Economic Growth Solutions (EGS), the Manufacturing Growth Programme promises to fill the void left by MAS by providing access to specialist assistance to help firms grow and improve. With an 18-strong network of experienced Manufacturing Growth Managers, the majority of which previously delivered the MAS programme, providing bespoke honest advice, MGP also provides access to industry specialists and grant funding to support improvement projects.

In July 2017, the programme had supported more than 1,000 SME Manufacturers, created more than 400 new jobs for the industry and enabled companies to make sustainable changes to support continuous growth.

== Function ==
It has a helpline for advice. It can conduct a free Manufacturing Review on SME manufacturers, and offers subsidised consultancy (up to 50%), and has local events.

The support offered by the Manufacturing Advisory Service covers

Level 1 (Enquiries) Provided by a small team of advisors geographically dispersed round England supported by a website offering online support.

Level 2 (Manufacturing Review) Continue to provide 1 day (2 days for more complex businesses), on-site specialist manufacturing diagnostic review. MAC will use a new diagnostic tool based on the principles of "Manufacturing Excellence" developed in conjunction with the Warwick Manufacturing Group which includes comparisons against best-in-class. In addition, a "Fast Track" over the 'phone Level 2 will be introduced for common, well understood issues.

Level 3 (Events) Continue to provide training and networking events, including best practice visits. These will be an integral part of delivering the Business Improvement actions identified at Level 2. This will be complemented by a Sustainable Improvement Community using best practice social networking tools to provide peer-led best practice examples and lower cost forms of self-help.

Level 4 (Consultancy) Introduction of a three tier Level 4 project structure: · MAS Foundation Service: Funding up to £1,000 (or a maximum of 50%) towards an improvement project - targeted at companies who need basic low-level help. · MAS Step Change Service: Funding of up to £3,000 (or 50% maximum) towards a more significant improvement programme. · MAS Transformation Service: Funding of up to £10,000 (or 50% maximum) for a strategic change to the business.

Level 5 (Referrals) MAS advisors are responsible for identifying partner organisation support but retain responsibility for referral until it is demonstrated and confirmed by the client that the partner organisation has addressed the client need.

Supply Chain Focus on helping SMEs diversify into advanced manufacturing supply chains; helping original equipment manufacturers and their supply chains develop better relationships and greater efficiency; helping groups of SMEs in supply chains or clusters interact more effectively. It will use the tools available through Levels 1 - 5 with custom implementation packages assembled to suit client needs delivered by a team of dedicated supply chain experts.

== See also ==
- Manufacturing Technologies Association
- Manufacturing in the United Kingdom
- Technology life cycle
- New Enterprise Allowance
