= North East Regional Employers' Organisation =

- The North East England region shown in England
- Predecessor: North East Assembly
- Successor: North East Combined Authority; Tees Valley Combined Authority
- Formation: 1 April 2009; 17 years ago
- Dissolved: May 2024
- Headquarters: Newcastle Guildhall
- Location: Newcastle upon Tyne
- Region served: North East England
- Parent organisation: Local Government Association
- Website: www.nereo.gov.uk

The North East Regional Employers' Organisation, previously the Association of North East Councils is a partnership body made up of representatives of local authorities in North East England. It acts as the regional employers organisation.

In April 2009 it assumed the role of the regional Local Authority Leaders’ Board following the abolition of the North East Assembly.

The Association of North East Councils became the North East Regional Employers' Organisation in March 2016, following the creation of a North East Combined Authority, which comprises local authorities outside of Tees Valley; with Tees Valley local authorities forming the separate Tees Valley Combined Authority.
