= Government Offices for the English regions =

Government Offices for the English regions (GOs) were established in 1994 by the John Major government. Until 2011, they were the primary means by which a wide range of policies and programmes of the Government of the United Kingdom were delivered in the regions of England.

There were Government Offices in the East Midlands, East of England, London, North East, North West (until 1998 there was a separate GO for Merseyside), South East, South West, West Midlands and Yorkshire and the Humber regions.

== Purpose ==
The Offices represented thirteen Whitehall departments, and were involved in regenerating communities, fighting crime, tackling housing needs, improving public health, raising standards in education and skills, tackling countryside issues and reducing unemployment.

== Departments represented ==
By the time of their abolition, there were twelve Whitehall Departments represented in the Offices:

- Department for Communities and Local Government (lead department)
- Department for Business, Innovation and Skills
- Cabinet Office
- Department for Culture, Media and Sport
- Department for Children, Schools and Families
- Department of Energy and Climate Change
- Department for Environment, Food and Rural Affairs
- Department of Health
- Department for Transport
- Department for Work and Pensions
- Home Office
- Ministry of Justice
- HM Treasury

== Abolition ==
The abolition of the Government Offices was announced in the Coalition Government's Spending Review in October 2010. It was stated at that time that "The GO Network will therefore close no later than the end of March 2011. Functions undertaken by the GO Network are now in the process of being wound down, with the exception of a small number which may transfer elsewhere."

== See also ==
- Regional development agency
- Regional minister
- Category:Regional select committees of the British House of Commons
- Regional State Administrative Agency (Finland)
