= South West Councils =

Association of local government leaders from the South West of England

- Abbreviation: SWC
- Predecessor: South West Regional Assembly
- Founded: 2009
- Headquarters: Dennett House
- Location: Taunton
- Region served: South West of England
- Website: www.swcouncils.gov.uk
- Formerly called: South West Regional Assembly

South West Councils is an association of council leaders from the South West of England. It is a regional grouping of the Local Government Association and the regional employers organisation.

It was established in May 2009 following the abolition of the South West Regional Assembly. It brings together the 41 local authorities in the region to:

- Provide a voice for constituent local authorities on major issues affecting the South West
- Influence Government policy as it affects the region
- Encourage partnership working between local authorities and other organisations and agencies in the South West on policy issues where a broader regional approach is required
- Promote the sharing of good practice
- Support councils through delivery of the Regional Improvement and Efficiency Partnership.

Cllr Angus Campbell, Leader of Dorset County Council was the first Chairman of the new body. The current Chairman is Cllr John Hart from Devon County Council.

== South West Leaders ==
South West Leaders is the executive arm of South West Councils and functions as the Local Authority Leaders’ Board for the region. The board has 20 members, made up of County and Unitary Council Leaders, and one each from the Districts in Devon, Dorset, Gloucestershire and Somerset.
