= West Midlands Employers =

The West Midlands Employers are a regional grouping of local authorities in the West Midlands region of England.

It was originally established as the Local Authority Leaders’ Board for the West Midlands region of England around 2010. When the West Midlands Regional Assembly was dissolved in March 2010, it assumed the boards' duties and functions.

The body was initially known as the West Midlands Leaders Board, changing its identity in July 2010, following abolition of regional spatial strategies by the new UK administration.

The secretariat for the West Midlands Leaders' Board has since been incorporated in-house by Wolverhampton City Council, rather than a separate body exist for such purposes.
