= Advantage West Midlands =

Regional development agency in England

Advantage West Midlands Development Agency
- Formation: 1999
- Legal status: Regional Development Agency
- Region served: West Midlands region
- Chair: Sir Roy McNulty
- Website: www.advantagewm.co.uk
- Remarks: Appointment: Department for Business, Innovation and Skills (BIS)

Advantage West Midlands was established in 1999 as one of nine regional development agencies (RDAs) in England. RDAs were created by the UK Government to drive sustainable economic development and social and physical regeneration through a business-led approach. Operating at arm's length from government, RDAs had business-led Boards that were appointed by the Secretary of State for Business, Innovation and Skills. Advantage West Midlands was closed on 31 March 2012 as part of the wider closure of the RDA network.

== Investment ==
Between 1999 and 2012 Advantage West Midlands invested £3 billion to support sustainable economic development in the West Midlands region, generating a range of outputs including:

- 150,000 businesses assisted to improve their performance;
- 10,000 businesses created;
- 140,000 jobs created or safeguarded;
- 160,000 people assisted to improve their skills;
- £2 billion of private sector investment levered in; and
- 1,200 hectares of brownfield land reclaimed or redeveloped.

(The above outputs are based on Government-defined measures. Each RDA reported performance against these measures in their Annual Report and Accounts.)

The Government also commissioned independent evaluation and assessments of RDA performance.

- In 2007, the Government commissioned economic development consultants Price WaterhouseCoopers to evaluate the effectiveness of RDA investment programmes. Their final report was published in March 2009. It indicated that every £1 invested by Advantage West Midlands was returning £7.45 of gross value added (GVA) to the regional economy. Subsequent evaluations commissioned by the Agency indicated that, by 2010, this return had increased to £8.14 for every £1 invested.
- The National Audit Office undertook two detailed assessments of RDA performance – the Independent Performance Assessment of 2006–7 and the Independent Supplementary Review of 2009–10. In each, Advantage West Midlands achieved the maximum possible rating.

In addition to Government-commissioned evaluations or assessments – and as part of its own continuous improvement programme – from 2007 Advantage West Midlands participated in the annual "Midlands Excellence Awards," with the following results:

- 2007 – Achieved the “Investors in Excellence” standard
- 2008 – “Finalist”
- 2009 – “Finalist”, “Highly Commended” and “Most Improved Organisation”
- 2010 – Overall award winner (“large public sector” category)

== Key regional projects ==
Projects enabled with investment from Advantage West Midlands include:

- redevelopment of New Street station, Birmingham – at £100 million the largest single project investment by any RDA and expected to create 10,000 jobs and generate £2 billion in wider economic benefits;
- a £58 million joint-venture with Urban Splash to regenerate the Fort Dunlop building alongside junction 5 of the M6 motorway;
- creation of a strategic development site and construction of new premises for Ericsson and the Manufacturing Technology Centre (MTC) at Ansty Park, Coventry;
- regeneration of a major site to create the "i54" development opportunity in Wolverhampton/Southern Staffordshire, which has attracted investment by Jaguar Land Rover, U.S. aerospace company Moog and specialists food and feed testing company Eurofins Laboratories;
- Science park developments at Keele, Aston, Wolverhampton, Worcestershire, Coventry and Warwickshire – including the UK's first virtual-reality, Advanced Construction Centre;
- 392 inward investment projects by international companies, which have created or safeguarded 12,161 jobs in the West Midlands.

The Agency also led the region's response to major economic shocks such as the sale of MG Rover in 2000 and its subsequent closure in 2005, the Foot and Mouth outbreak of 2001, the 2007 Floods and the global economic recession that struck in 2009.

== The RDA Act ==
Advantage West Midlands was established by the UK Government (Labour administration: 1997 – 2010) under the Regional Development Agencies Act 1998. The Act set out the five statutory purposes for England's RDAs:

- to further economic development and regeneration;
- to promote business efficiency, investment and competitiveness; "
- to promote employment;
- to enhance the development and application of skill relevant to employment; and
- to contribute to sustainable development.

To fulfil these goals, RDAs used economic data and analysis to develop Regional Economic Strategies, invested their resources to deliver their share of the strategy and influenced partner organisations to do likewise.

== Changing Government approach to economic development ==
In June 2010, the new Conservative/Liberal Democrat Coalition Government announced that it would pursue a different approach to economic development. This new approach would work at a smaller geographical scale than regions – and reflecting the administration's "Localism" agenda.

At the same time, it was announced that all RDAs, including Advantage West Midlands, would close down by March 2012. Responsibility for economic development in England would pass to successor bodies, including Government departments, other national agencies and newly created Local enterprise partnerships.

== Geographical Coverage ==
The West Midlands comprises the counties of Shropshire, Staffordshire, Warwickshire and Worcestershire; the unitary authorities of Herefordshire, Stoke-on-Trent and Telford and Wrekin; and the seven metropolitan districts of Birmingham, Coventry, Dudley, Sandwell, Solihull, Walsall and Wolverhampton.
