= Regions of England =

Highest tier of sub-national division in England

- Category: Statistical regions; Administrative region (1)
- Location: England
- Number: 9 regions: North East England; North West England; Yorkshire and The Humber; West Midlands; East Midlands; East of England; London; South West England; South East England
- Additional status: ITL 1 region; European constituency (1999–2020)
- Populations: 2,669,941–9,180,135
- Areas: 1,572–23,836 km^{2}
- Government: Local authority leaders' board (5); Elected assembly (1); None (3)
- Subdivisions: Two-tier non-metropolitan county (21); Metropolitan county (6); Unitary authority area (62); London borough (32 Greater London, 1 City of London); ITL-2 statistical regions (36)

The regions of England, formerly known as the government office regions, are the highest tier of sub-national division in England. They were established in 1994 and follow the 1974–96 county borders. They are a continuation of the former 1940s standard regions which followed the 1889–1974 administrative county borders. Between 1994 and 2011, all nine regions had partly devolved functions; they no longer fulfil this role, continuing to be used for limited statistical purposes.

While the UK was a member of the European Union, they defined areas (constituencies) for the purposes of elections to the European Parliament. Eurostat also used them to demarcate first level Nomenclature of Territorial Units for Statistics (NUTS) regions ("NUTS 1 regions") within the European Union, which in 2021 were superseded by International Territorial Level (ITL) regions ("ITL 1 regions").

The London region has a directly elected Mayor and Assembly. Six regions have local authority leaders' boards to assist with correlating the headline policies of local authorities. The remaining two regions no longer have any administrative functions, having abolished their regional local authority leaders' boards.

In 1998, regional chambers were established in the eight regions outside London, which produced strategic plans and recommendations to local authorities. Each of the regions also had an associated (central) Government Office with some responsibility for coordinating policy, and, from 2007, a part-time regional minister within the Government. House of Commons regional Select Committees were established in 2009. However, the chambers and select committees were abolished in May 2010, restoring these functions to the main tier of local government, with limited functions transferred to the regional local authority leaders' boards created in 2009. Regional ministers were not reappointed by the incoming Coalition Government, and the Government Offices were abolished in 2011.

From 2011, combined authorities have been introduced in some city regions, with similar responsibilities to the former regional chambers (and in some cases, replacing a regional local authority leaders' board on a smaller scale), but which also receive additional delegated functions from central government relating to transport and economic policy.

Regional development agencies were public bodies established in all nine regions in 1998 to promote economic development. They had certain delegated functions, including administering European Union regional development funds, and received funding from the central government as well. These were abolished in 2012, with statutory functions returning to local authorities and central government; however, smaller scale local enterprise partnerships were voluntarily established to take on some functions relating to coordinating economic priorities and development.

== History ==
=== Background ===
After about 500 AD, England comprised seven Anglo-Saxon territories—Northumbria, Mercia, East Anglia, Essex, Kent, Sussex and Wessex—often referred to as the heptarchy. The boundaries of some of these, which later unified as the Kingdom of England, roughly coincide with those of modern regions. During Oliver Cromwell's Protectorate in the 1650s, the rule of the Major-Generals created 10 regions in England and Wales of similar size to the modern regions.

Proposals for administrative regions within England were mooted by the British government prior to the First World War. In 1912, the Third Home Rule Bill was passing through parliament. The Bill was expected to introduce a devolved parliament for Ireland, and as a consequence calls were made for similar structures to be introduced in Great Britain or "Home Rule All Round". On 12 September the First Lord of the Admiralty, Winston Churchill, gave a speech in which he proposed 10 or 12 regional parliaments for the United Kingdom. Within England, he suggested that London, Lancashire, Yorkshire, and the Midlands would make natural regions. While the creation of regional parliaments never became official policy, it was for a while widely anticipated and various schemes for dividing England devised. By the 1930s, several competing systems of regions were adopted by central government for such purposes as census of population, agriculture, electricity supply, civil defence and the regulation of road traffic. Nine "standard regions" were set up in 1946, in which central government bodies, statutory undertakings and regional bodies were expected to cooperate. However, these had declined in importance by the late 1950s.

Creation of some form of provinces or regions for England was an intermittent theme of post-Second World War British governments. The Redcliffe-Maud Report proposed the creation of eight provinces in England, which would see power devolved from central government. Edward Heath's administration in the 1970s did not create a regional structure in the Local Government Act 1972, waiting for the Royal Commission on the Constitution, after which government efforts were concentrated on a constitutional settlement in Scotland and Wales for the rest of the decade. In England, the majority of the Commission "suggested regional coordinating and advisory councils for England, consisting largely of indirectly elected representatives of local authorities and operating along the lines of the Welsh advisory council". One-fifth of the advisory councils would be nominees from central government. The boundaries suggested were the "eight now [in 1973] existing for economic planning purposes, modified to make boundaries to conform with the new county structure". A minority report by Lord Crowther-Hunt and Alan T. Peacock suggested instead seven regional assemblies and governments within Great Britain (five within England), which would take over substantial amounts of the central government.

Some elements of regional development and economic planning began to be established in England from the mid-1960s onwards. In most of the standard regions, Economic Planning Councils and Boards were set up, comprising appointed members from local authorities, business, trade unions and universities, and in the early 1970s, these produced a number of regional and sub-regional planning studies. These institutions continued to operate until they were abolished by the incoming Conservative government in 1979. However, by the mid-1980s local authorities in most regions had jointly established standing conferences to consider regional planning issues. Regional initiatives were bolstered by the 1986 Government Green Paper and 1989 White Paper on The Future of Development Plans, which proposed the introduction of strong regional guidance within the planning system, and by the Government's issuing of Strategic Guidance at a regional level, from 1986 onwards.

=== Regions as areas of administration ===
In April 1994, the John Major ministry created a set of ten Government Office Regions for England. Prior to 1994, although various central government departments had different regional offices, the regions they used tended to be different and ad hoc. The stated purpose was as a way of co-ordinating the various regional offices more effectively: they initially involved the Department of Trade and Industry, Department of Employment, Department of Transport and the Department for the Environment. Following the Labour Party's victory in the 1997 general election, the government created regional development agencies. Around a decade later the Labour administration also founded the Regional Improvement and Efficiency Partnerships (RIEPs) with £185m of devolved funding to enhance councils' capacity to improve and take the lead in their own improvement.

The Maastricht Treaty encouraged the creation of regional boundaries for selection of members for the Committee of the Regions of the European Union: Wales, Scotland and Northern Ireland had each constituted a region, but England represents such a large proportion of the population of the United Kingdom that further division was thought necessary. The English regions, which initially numbered ten, also replaced the Standard Statistical Regions. Merseyside originally constituted a region in itself, but in 1998 it was merged into the North West England region, creating the nine present-day regions. The nine regions were used as England's European Parliament constituencies from 1999 until Britain's departure from the European Union; and as statistical NUTS level 1 regions.

From 2006 to 2013, there were ten strategic health authorities (SHAs), which were part of the structure of the National Health Service in England. Each SHA corresponded to a region, except for South East England, which was divided into western and eastern parts. Each SHA was responsible for managing performance, enacting directives and implementing health policy as required by the Department of Health at a regional level. Initially twenty-eight in number, they were reduced to ten in 2006. Along with primary care trusts, they were replaced by clinical commissioning groups and Public Health England in 2013 under the Health and Social Care Act 2012.

In 1998, regional chambers were created in the eight English regions outside London under the provisions of the Regional Development Agencies Act 1998. The powers of the assemblies were limited, and members were appointed, largely by local authorities, rather than being directly elected. The functions of the English regions were essentially devolved to them from Government departments or were taken over from pre-existing regional bodies, such as regional planning conferences and regional employers' organisations. Each assembly also made proposals for the UK members of the Committee of the Regions, with members drawn from the elected councillors of the local authorities in the region. The final nominations were made by central government. Although they were publicly funded, one of the Regional Assemblies claimed not to be a public authority and therefore not subject to the Freedom of Information Act 2000.

As power was to be devolved to Scotland, Northern Ireland and Wales without corresponding devolution in England, a series of referendums were planned to establish elected regional assemblies in some of the regions. The first was held in London in 1998 and was passed. The London Assembly and Mayor of London of the Greater London Authority were created in 2000. A referendum was held in North East England on 4 November 2004, but the proposal for an elected assembly was rejected.

=== Abolition of regional institutions ===
In 2007, a Treasury Review for new Prime Minister Gordon Brown recommended that greater powers should be given to local authorities and that the Regional Chambers should be phased out of existence by 2010. The same year, nine Regional Ministers were appointed by the incoming Brown ministry. Their primary goal was stated as being to improve communication between central government and the regions of England. The assemblies were effectively replaced by smaller local authority leaders' boards between 2008 and 2010, and formally abolished on 31 March 2010, as part of a "Sub-National Review of Economic Development and Regeneration". Most of their functions transferred to the relevant regional development agency and to local authority leaders' boards.

In June 2010, the incoming Coalition Government announced its intentions to abolish regional strategies and return spatial planning powers to local government. These plans include the withdrawal of funding to the existing eight Local Authority Leaders' Boards, with their statutory functions also being assumed by local councils. The boards in most cases continue to exist as voluntary associations of council leaders, funded by the local authorities themselves. No appointments as Regional Ministers were made by the incoming UK government in 2010.

These changes did not affect the directly elected London Assembly, which was established by separate legislation as part of the Greater London Authority. In 2011, Greater London remains administered by the Greater London Authority, which consists of an elected London Assembly and a separately elected Mayor of London.

Following the abolition of the Government Offices in 2011, it was announced that the former Government Office Regions (GOR) would henceforth be known, for the purposes of statistical analysis, simply as Regions.

== List of regions ==
Population of England by region (2025)
| Region | GSS code | ITL code | Land area | | | Population | | Density | |
| Region | GSS code | ITL code | (km^{2}) | (mi^{2}) | (%) | People | (%) | (/km^{2}) | (/mi^{2}) |
|---|---|---|---|---|---|---|---|---|---|
| North East England | E12000001 | TLC | 8,581 | 3,313 | 7% | 2,762,746 | 5% | 322 | 830 |
| North West England | E12000002 | TLD | 14,108 | 5,447 | 11% | 7,772,854 | 13% | 551 | 1,430 |
| Yorkshire and the Humber | E12000003 | TLE | 15,404 | 5,948 | 12% | 5,672,166 | 10% | 368 | 950 |
| East Midlands | E12000004 | TLF | 15,623 | 6,032 | 12% | 5,085,641 | 9% | 326 | 840 |
| West Midlands | E12000005 | TLG | 12,998 | 5,019 | 10% | 6,205,854 | 11% | 477 | 1,240 |
| East of England | E12000006 | TLH | 19,116 | 7,381 | 15% | 6,613,801 | 11% | 346 | 900 |
| London | E12000007 | TLI | 1,572 | 607 | 1% | 9,122,909 | 16% | 5,804 | 15,030 |
| South East England | E12000008 | TLJ | 19,072 | 7,364 | 15% | 9,691,844 | 16% | 508 | 1,320 |
| South West England | E12000009 | TLK | 23,836 | 9,203 | 18% | 5,906,997 | 10% | 248 | 640 |
| England | E92000001 | | 130,310 | 50,310 | 100% | 58,834,812 | 100% | 451 | 1,170 |

GVA and GDP of England by region (2021)
| Region | GSS code | ITL code | Population | GVA | | GDP | |
| Region | GSS code | ITL code | Population | Total (£ billions) | Per capita (£) | Total (£ billions) | Per capita (£) |
|---|---|---|---|---|---|---|---|
| North East England | E12000001 | TLC | 2,646,772 | £56.5 | £21,340 | £65.0 | £24,575 |
| North West England | E12000002 | TLD | 7,422,295 | £196.0 | £26,411 | £220.3 | £29,681 |
| Yorkshire and the Humber | E12000003 | TLE | 5,481,431 | £133.4 | £24,330 | £151.8 | £27,692 |
| East Midlands | E12000004 | TLF | 4,880,094 | £118.4 | £24,261 | £134.2 | £27,505 |
| West Midlands | E12000005 | TLG | 5,954,240 | £146.1 | £24,530 | £164.6 | £27,649 |
| East of England | E12000006 | TLH | 6,348,096 | £171.4 | £26,995 | £193.3 | £30,442 |
| London | E12000007 | TLI | 8,796,628 | £487.4 | £55,412 | £526.5 | £59,855 |
| South East England | E12000008 | TLJ | 9,294,023 | £301.5 | £32,443 | £336.2 | £36,174 |
| South West England | E12000009 | TLK | 5,712,840 | £149.8 | £26,219 | £169.3 | £29,628 |
| England | E92000001 | | 56,536,419 | £1,760.4 | £31,138 | £1,961.2 | £34,690 |

== Subdivisions ==
Local government in England does not follow a uniform structure. Therefore, each region is divided into a range of further subdivisions. London is divided into London boroughs and the City of London, while the other regions are divided into strategic authorities, metropolitan counties, shire counties and unitary authorities. Counties are further divided into districts and some areas are also yet further divided into civil parishes. Regions are also divided into sub-regions, which usually group socio-economically linked local authorities together. However, the sub-regions have no official status and are little used other than for strategic planning purposes.

== ITL 1 statistical regions ==
ITL 1 regions labelled by letter of ITL code

The regions of England are used as first-level divisions of the United Kingdom in the International Territorial Level (ITL). This is a geocode standard for referencing the subdivisions of the UK for statistical purposes, used by the Office for National Statistics (ONS) since 2021. ITL-1 is the first-level division of the UK into 12 regions: besides the nine regions of England, the other three ITL-1 regions are Wales, Scotland and Northern Ireland. Each region is allocated a code: TL (for Territorial Level), followed by a single letter, C to N, as shown in the table above.

The ITL geocode standard is based on the European Statistical System's Nomenclature of Territorial Units for Statistics (NUTS) standard that was used between 2003 and 2021, when the United Kingdom was part of the European Union. The NUTS-1 divisions were the same as the present ITL-1 regions. The NUTS code for the UK was UK and the NUTS-1 division codes were the ITL-1 codes, but with UK instead of TL.

Each ITL-1 region is divided into ITL-2 regions, which comprise counties, combined authorities (now called strategic authorities) and groups of counties. The ONS have tried to align boundaries with combined authorities where possible in the 2025 review. These are further divided into ITL-3 regions, which are in turn divided into two levels of Local Administrative Units (LAU).
