= East of England Development Agency =

The East of England Development Agency (EEDA) was a non-departmental public body and the regional development agency for the East of England region of England.

It came into operation on 1 April 1999 and assumed the regional powers of English Partnerships, the Rural Development Commission and the SRB Challenge Fund.

The total budget for 2005/06 was £140 million.

From 2010 many of the powers that were vested in the East of England Regional Assembly were passed to the EEDA and to local authorities.

The East of England Development Agency was abolished on 31 March 2012. Part of its remit was assumed by the relevant Local Enterprise Partnership (LEP). LEPs were introduced by the Government in 2010 and are local authority and business-led organisations designed to create jobs and increase private sector growth.
