= Historical and alternative regions of England =

Sub-national divisions of England

England is divided by a number of different regional schemes for various purposes. Since the creation of the Government Office Regions in 1994 and their adoption for statistical purposes in 1999, some historical regional schemes have become obsolete. However, many alternative regional designations also exist and continue to be widely used.

== Alternative ==
=== Cultural ===
Informal and overlapping regional designations are often used to describe areas of England. They include:

- Midlands, often considered interchangeable with Mercia
  - Black Country
  - Welsh Marches
  - Staffordshire Potteries
  - Three Counties
- Northern England
  - Scottish Marches
  - Yorkshire
- Southern England
  - The Hundred Parishes
  - Home Counties
    - M4 corridor
      - Thames Valley
  - Cinque Ports
  - West Country, often considered interchangeable with Wessex
  - Cotswolds
  - Weald

=== Heptarchy ===
Heptarchy, former kingdom names which did not become counties have continued to be recognised by organisations as regions:

- Wessex, generally interchangeable with the West Country (excluding Cornwall)
- East Anglia
- Mercia, often considered interchangeable with the Midlands
- Northumbria, associated mainly with North East England (or the historic Counties of Northumberland and Durham), however, can also be considered interchangeable with Northern England

=== Counties ===
- Sussex
- Yorkshire
  - North Riding of Yorkshire
  - West Riding of Yorkshire
  - East Riding of Yorkshire (historic)
- Middlesex

=== National parks ===
National parks include:

- Peak District
- Lake District
- Dartmoor
- Exmoor
- North York Moors
- Northumberland National Park
- The Broads
- New Forest
- Yorkshire Dales
- South Downs

=== Britain in Bloom regions ===
Britain in Bloom divides England into 12 regions, bearing a mixture of government regions with some altered names. It also includes Cumbria, Thames-and-Chilterns (Berkshire, Buckinghamshire and Oxfordshire) and part of south east and south west as South-and-South-West.

=== National Trust ===
The National Trust has 10 regional offices in England. These are

- Devon and Cornwall – part of the official South West region
- East of England – as region
- East Midlands – as region
- North East England – North East England and Yorkshire and the Humber
- North West England – as region
- Thames and Solent – Berkshire, Buckinghamshire, London, Oxfordshire, Hampshire
- South East England – East Sussex, Kent, Surrey, West Sussex
- West Midlands – as region
- Wessex – South West England without Devon and Cornwall

=== Postcodes ===
Postcodes are used as alternatives to administrative units for statistics. Some areas and districts are close to geographic terminology where administrative borders differ, such as:

- The LA postcode area, covering Morecambe Bay
- PE, The Fens
- E, EC, N, NW, SE, SW, W and WC for Inner London

== Historical ==
Southern Great Britain around the year 800

=== Before 500 ===
Dumnonia was a Brythonic kingdom in present-day part of South West England.

=== 500–1066 ===
An approximate depiction of Danelaw's effect on Mercia, showing the Five Burghs, in the early 10th century

After the end of the Roman occupation of Britain, the area now known as England became divided into seven Anglo-Saxon kingdoms: Northumbria, Mercia, East Anglia, Essex, Kent, Sussex and Wessex. A number of other smaller political divisions and sub-kingdoms existed. The kingdoms were eventually united into the Kingdom of England in a process beginning with Egbert of Wessex in 829 and completed by King Edred in 954. The Norse kingdom of Jorvik, also known as Scandinavian Yorkshire, was not annexed into England until 1066 and the Harrying of the North.

=== 1066–1655 ===
Counties shared a sheriff for varying lengths of time, some for centuries:

- 1068-1566 Nottinghamshire, Derbyshire and the Royal Forests
- 1125-1575 Bedfordshire and Buckinghamshire
- 1154-1635 Cambridgeshire and Huntingdonshire
- 1156-1567 Essex and Hertfordshire
- 1158-1566 Leicestershire and Warwickshire
- 1204-1344 Shropshire and Staffordshire
- 1226-1567 Somerset and Dorset
- 1242-1567 Surrey and Sussex
- 1259-1566 Berkshire and Oxfordshire
- Before conquest-1576 Norfolk and Suffolk

=== 1655–1657 ===
Map of the regions of England and Wales under the Major-Generals, 1655–1657

During The Protectorate, Oliver Cromwell experimented with the Rule of the Major-Generals. There were ten regional associations covering England and Wales administered by majors-general. Ireland under Major-General Henry Cromwell, and Scotland under Major-General George Monck were in administrations already agreed upon and were not part of the scheme.

=== World War II ===
In the Second World War, England was divided into ten civil defence regions:
1. Northern: Durham, Northumberland, Yorkshire, North Riding
2. North Eastern: Yorkshire, East and West Riding
3. North Midland: Derbyshire, Leicestershire, Lincolnshire, Northamptonshire, Nottinghamshire, Rutland
4. Eastern: Bedfordshire, Cambridgeshire, Essex, Hertfordshire, Huntingdonshire, Norfolk, Suffolk
5. London: larger area than County of London/Middlesex, possibly same as Metropolitan Police District
6. Southern: Berkshire, Buckinghamshire, Dorset, Hampshire, Oxfordshire
7. South Western: Cornwall, Devon, Gloucestershire, Somerset, Wiltshire
8. Midland: Herefordshire, Shropshire, Staffordshire, Warwickshire, Worcestershire
9. North Western: Cheshire, Cumberland, Lancashire and Westmorland
10. South Eastern: Kent, Surrey and Sussex

=== 1945–1994 ===
==== Economic planning regions ====
Eight economic planning regions were named by the Secretary of State for Economic Affairs, George Brown in December 1964. These were:

- Northern – Cumberland, Durham, North Riding of Yorkshire, Northumberland, Westmorland
- North-West – Cheshire, Lancashire, High Peak area of Derbyshire
- Yorkshire and Humberside – East Riding of Yorkshire, West Riding of Yorkshire – Lincolnshire, Parts of Lindsey
- East Midlands – Derbyshire (minus High Peak), Leicestershire, Lincolnshire, Parts of Holland, Lincolnshire, Parts of Kesteven, Northamptonshire, Nottinghamshire, Rutland
- West Midlands – Herefordshire, Shropshire, Staffordshire, Warwickshire, Worcestershire
- South West – Cornwall, Devon, Dorset, Gloucestershire, Somerset, Wiltshire
- South East – Bedfordshire, Berkshire, Buckinghamshire, Essex, Greater London, Hampshire, Kent, Oxfordshire, Hertfordshire, Surrey, Sussex
- East Anglia – Norfolk, Suffolk, Cambridgeshire and Isle of Ely, Huntingdon and Peterborough

==== Standard statistical regions ====
Before the adoption of the government office regions for statistics, there were eight 'standard statistical regions':

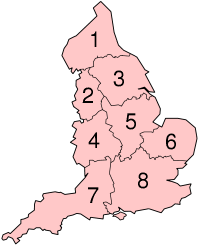
Standard Statistical Regions

1. North – current North East plus Cumbria
2. North West – current North West less Cumbria
3. Yorkshire and Humberside – as current Yorkshire and the Humber
4. West Midlands – as now
5. East Midlands – as now
6. East Anglia – Norfolk, Suffolk, and Cambridgeshire
7. South West – as now
8. South East – as now, plus Greater London, Bedfordshire, Essex, and Hertfordshire

==== Civil defence regions ====
The present government office regions closely resemble Civil Defence Regions. During the latter part of the Cold War, the United Kingdom was divided into 11 such regions, most of which were divided themselves into sub-regions. The regions were numbered as shown in the list, numbers for sub-regions were of the form 1_{1}.

The regions were based on pre-Second World War regions, but were substantially altered in the 1970s, with the merger of South East and Southern regions, and alterations in the north. They were again altered in 1984, to merge the English regions 1 and 2 to become a single North East region, and Scotland's two southern regions (East and West Zones) becoming a single South Zone.

===== 1980s =====
From the mid-1980s, the eight English Civil Defence Regions were as follows (using 1974/1975 boundaries):

1. North East England
  1. (North East England) – Cleveland/Durham/Northumberland/Tyne and Wear
  2. (Yorkshire and the Humber) – Humberside/North Yorkshire/South Yorkshire/West Yorkshire
2. East Midlands
  1. Derbyshire/Lincolnshire/Nottinghamshire
  2. Leicestershire/Northamptonshire
3. East of England
  1. (East Anglia) – Cambridgeshire/Norfolk/Suffolk
  2. Bedfordshire/Essex/Hertfordshire
4. Greater London – see Civil defence centres in London for sub-regions
5. South East England
  1. East Sussex/Kent/Surrey/West Sussex
  2. Berkshire/Buckinghamshire/Hampshire/Isle of Wight/Oxfordshire
6. South West England
  1. Avon/Dorset/Gloucestershire/Somerset/Wiltshire
  2. Cornwall/Devon
7. West Midlands
  1. Staffordshire/Warwickshire/West Midlands
  2. Hereford and Worcester/Shropshire
8. North West England
  1. Cumbria/Lancashire
  2. Cheshire/Greater Manchester/Merseyside

==== Redcliffe-Maud provinces ====
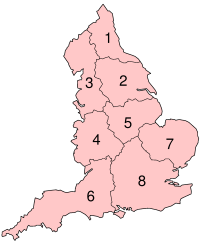
Redcliffe-Maud provinces

The Redcliffe-Maud Report produced by the Royal Commission on local government reform in 1969 recommended the creation of eight provinces. In approximate terms, these were to be:

1. North East – per North East England
2. Yorkshire – per Yorkshire and the Humber
3. North West – per North West England, excluding southern Cheshire
4. West Midlands – per West Midlands, including southern Cheshire
5. East Midlands – per East Midlands, less Northamptonshire and mid Lincolnshire
6. South West – per South West England
7. East Anglia – Cambridgeshire, Norfolk, Suffolk, northern Essex, southern Lincolnshire
8. South East – South East England and Greater London with Northamptonshire, Hertfordshire, Bedfordshire, southern Essex

== See also ==
- List of ITV regions
- BBC English Regions
- International Territorial Level
- Nomenclature of Territorial Units for Statistics
- The United States of Europe, A Eurotopia?
