= Yorkshire and Humber Local Authority Employers' Association =

The Yorkshire and Humber Local Authority Employers' Association, previously known as Local Government Yorkshire and Humber (LGYH) is a partnership of local authorities, including fire, police and national park authorities, across Yorkshire and Humber. It had links to the Local Government Association at national level and acts as the regional employers organisation for Yorkshire and Humber.

It brings local authorities together on key issues, supported the improvement of service delivery, influenced Government on the future of local government, promoted good employment practices, and worked with local authorities to improve the public perception and understanding of local government.

Local Government Yorkshire and Humber became Yorkshire and Humber Local Authority Employers' Association in March 2015.
