= North West Employers =

- Formation: 2008
- Legal status: Local Authority Leaders’ Board
- Headquarters: St Helens
- Region served: North West England

North West Employers, previously known as the North West Regional Leaders Board, is the Local Authority Leaders’ Board for the North West region of England. It was established on 15 July 2008 and replaced the North West Regional Assembly. It was initially based at Wigan, in Greater Manchester but has since moved to St Helens in Merseyside.

== Structure and membership ==
The board has 23 members of which 15 represent local government in the region and the remainder are drawn from business and the third sector. Three local government representatives will be drawn from each Ceremonial County in the region i.e., Cumbria, Cheshire, Lancashire, Merseyside and Greater Manchester. A further 7 members represent Social Economic and Environmental Partners (SEEPs) and one further member is nominated by the Lake District National Park Authority. Participating (non-voting) observers can also be appointed.

The board holds an annual meeting in July where a Chair and Deputy Chair are elected. The Chair is currently Councillor Sir Richard Leese, and the Chief Executive is Phil Robinson.

== Functions and responsibilities ==
The board will work in the areas of housing, energy and transport, will scrutinise the work of the Northwest Regional Development Agency and will contribute to the Single Regional Strategy combining economic development and spatial planning.

The forum's constitution describes its role as to:

- set the strategic direction for, contribute to the development of, support and approve the Regional Economic Strategy, Regional Spatial Strategy and any subsequent Single Regional Strategy
- approve the Forum budget
- influence key Regional strategies
- approve the Business Plan for the Forum
- monitor the delivery of the Business Plan
- approve and amend the Constitution and Standing Orders
- appoint its Chair and Deputy Chair
- appoint representatives to outside bodies.
- establish any sub-groups, appointing their Chairs and determining their terms of reference
