= 2004 North East England devolution referendum =

- 4 November 2004
- You can help to decide whether there should be an elected assembly in the North East region. If an elected assembly is to be established, it is intended that: the elected assembly would be responsible for a range of activities currently carried out mainly by central government bodies, including regional economic development; and; local government would be reorganised into a single-tier in those parts of the region that currently have both county and district councils.; Should there be an elected assembly for the North East region?

Results
Choice	Votes	%
Yes	197,310	22.07%
No	696,519	77.93%
Valid votes	893,829	98.62%
Invalid or blank votes	12,538	1.38%
Total votes	906,367	100.00%
Registered voters/turnout	1,899,742	47.71%
- Results by local authority

The 2004 North East England devolution referendum was an all postal ballot referendum that took place on 4 November 2004 throughout North East England on whether or not to establish an elected assembly for the region. Devolution referendums in the regions of Northern England were initially proposed under provisions of the Regional Assemblies (Preparations) Act 2003. Initially, three referendums were planned, but only one took place. The votes concerned the question of devolving limited political powers from the UK Parliament to elected regional assemblies in North East England, North West England and Yorkshire and the Humber respectively. Each were initially planned to be held on 4 November 2004, but on 22 July 2004 the planned referendums in North West England and in Yorkshire and the Humber were postponed, due to concerns raised about the use of postal ballots, but the referendum in North East England was allowed to continue, particularly as it was assumed that the region held the most support for the proposed devolution.

On 4 November 2004, voters in the North East rejected the proposal, in an all-postal ballot, by 77.9% to 22.1%, on a turnout of 48%. Every council area in the region had a majority for "no". The referendum was held in what was at the time arguably Labour's strongest region within the United Kingdom which included at the time the then Prime Minister Tony Blair's own constituency in Sedgefield. The defeat marked the end of the Labour Government's policy of devolution for England, and the other proposed referendums for the North West and for Yorkshire and the Humber were dropped indefinitely. This would also be the last major devolution referendum to be held in any part of the United Kingdom under the Labour Government of 1997–2010.

The campaign against the proposed Assembly was successfully led by local businessman John Elliott, who argued that the institution would have no real powers and that it would be a "white elephant" and too centric to Newcastle upon Tyne.

It was the first major referendum to be held in any part of the United Kingdom which was conducted and overseen by the Electoral Commission after its establishment in 2000 under the Political Parties, Elections and Referendums Act 2000.

== Background ==
The Labour government attempted to introduce directly elected English regional assemblies. The London Assembly was the first of these, established following a referendum in 1998, in which public and media attention was focused principally on the post of Mayor of London.

== Assembly proposals ==
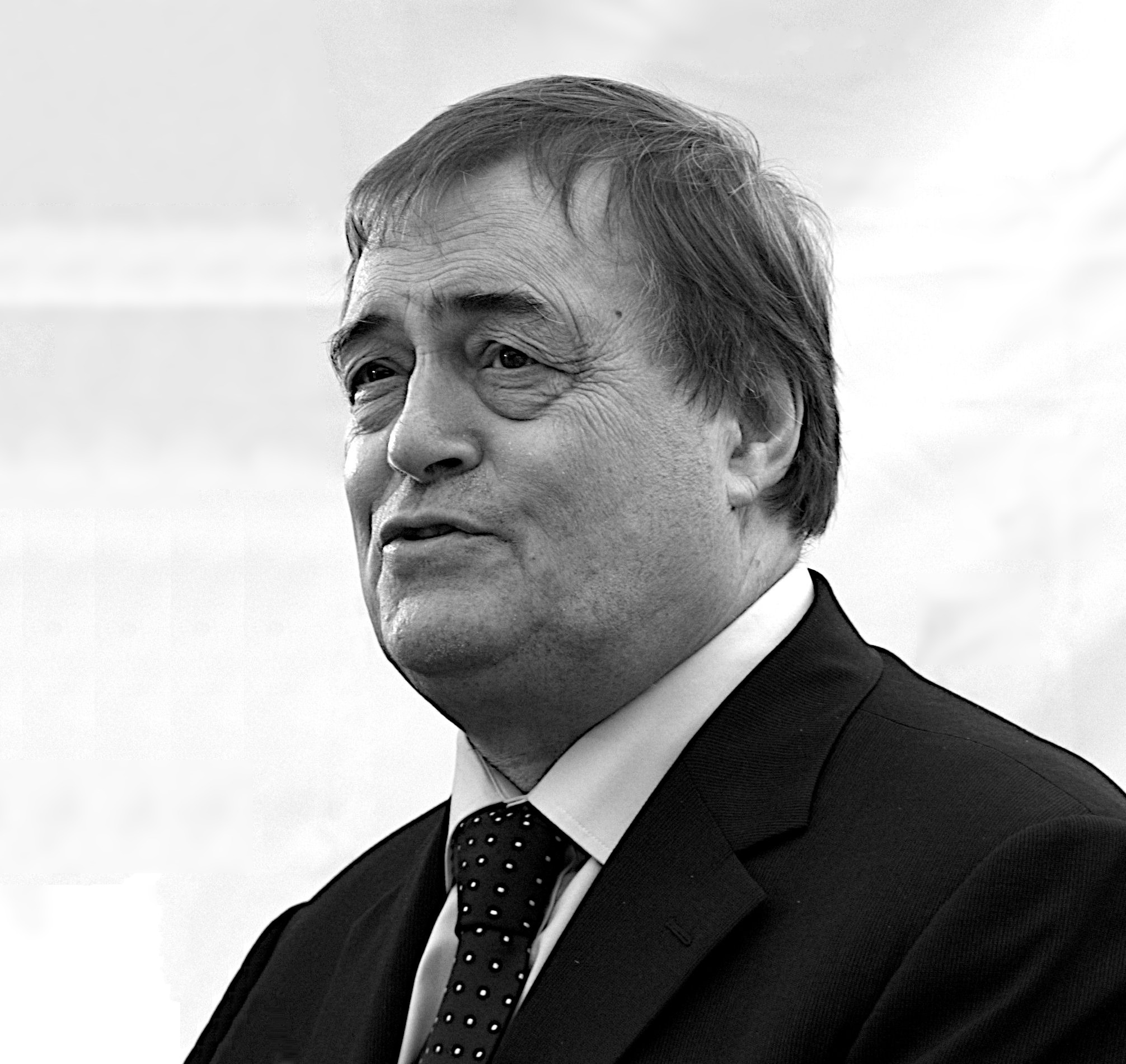
Then Deputy Prime Minister John Prescott, the key proponent of the proposed assembly plans

Voters were asked whether they wanted an elected regional assembly to be created for their region. The structure and powers of elected regional assemblies was outlined in a Draft Regional Assemblies Bill presented to Parliament by Deputy Prime Minister John Prescott in July 2004.

The draft bill proposed the following structure:

- The assembly would be a body corporate with a distinct legal identity.
- Each assembly would be composed of between 25 and 35 assembly members elected by the additional member system.
- The assembly would select one member as the chairman and another as deputy chairman to preside over its debates.
- The assembly would have an Executive (cabinet) composed of a Leader and between two and six Executive Members.

The draft bill would have given the assemblies the following powers:

- Promotion of economic development
- Promotion of social development
  - Promote health, safety and security
  - Reduce health inequalities
  - Enhance individual participation in society
  - Improve the availability of good housing
  - Improve skills and the availability of training
  - Improve the availability of cultural and recreational activities
- Improvement and protection of the environment
- Additional functions and duties that the Secretary of State thinks appropriate

== Local government reorganisation ==
The creation of regional assemblies was to be tied to abolition of the existing two-tier structure for local government in these regions; and its replacement with a uniform system of unitary authorities. In areas that had two-tier government (Cheshire, County Durham, Cumbria, Lancashire, North Yorkshire, Northumberland), voters were to be asked which pattern of unitary government they would like to see.

Two options were proposed by the Boundary Committee for each county in the review area – generally consisting of a single unitary authority for the entire county, or a break-up into smaller authorities which are larger than the existing districts. It was recommended that ceremonial counties be left untouched in most cases. This recommendation was broadly (with one minor alteration in West Lancashire) accepted by the Office of the Deputy Prime Minister.

Voting was to take place on a per-county council-area basis, except that the Cumbria and Lancashire votes would have been run as one – since it would be impossible to have option 1 in one and option 2 in another.

Any changes as a result of the North East referendum would probably have come into effect on 1 April 2006 – to give time for preparation, and taking into account 1 April as the traditional day of local government reform in the UK.

In Lancashire and Cumbria the proposals for multiple unitary authorities were very similar to those proposed by the Redcliffe-Maud Report in 1969. This proposed authorities for North Cumbria based in Carlisle, and one for Morecambe Bay covering Barrow-in-Furness and Lancaster for the north of the region. In central Lancashire there were to be divided into four authorities based on Blackpool, Preston, Blackburn and Burnley. The area of West Lancashire was to be given to Merseyside and included with Southport in a district.

The options were as follows for North East England:

=== North East England ===
==== County Durham ====
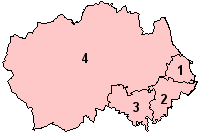
Option A
1. Hartlepool
2. Stockton-on-Tees
3. Darlington
4. Durham Council
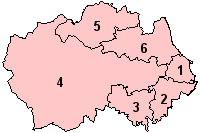
Option B
1. Hartlepool
2. Stockton-on-Tees
3. Darlington
4. South Durham
  (Sedgefield, Teesdale and Wear Valley)
5. North Durham
  (Chester-le-Street and Derwentside)
6. East Durham
  (Durham and Easington)

==== Northumberland ====
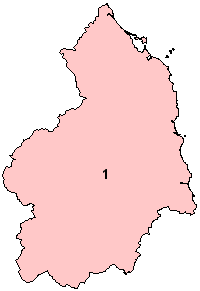
Option A
1. Northumberland Council
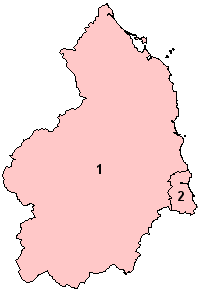
Option B
1. Rural Northumberland
  (Alnwick, Berwick-upon-Tweed, Castle Morpeth and Tynedale)
2. South East Northumberland
  (Blyth Valley and Wansbeck)

== Referendum questions ==
All voters in the North East England region were asked to vote on the question of whether or not there should be an elected Assembly. Voters in County Durham and Northumberland were asked to vote on an additional second question on proposals for local government reorganisation in the event of a "yes" vote.

=== Assembly referendum question ===
The question that appeared on ballot papers was:

You can help to decide whether there should be an elected assembly in the North East region.
If an elected assembly is to be established, it is intended that:

- the elected assembly would be responsible for a range of activities currently carried out mainly by central government bodies, including regional economic development; and
- local government would be reorganised into a single-tier in those parts of the region that currently have both county and district councils.

Should there be an elected assembly for the North East region?

permitting a simple YES / NO answer (to be marked with a single (X)).

=== Local Government reorganisation referendum question ===
The question that appeared on ballot papers in County Durham and Northumberland was:

If an assembly is established in the North East region, it is intended that local government will be reorganised into a single tier in those parts that currently have both county councils and district councils.

Your part of the region has currently both county councils and district councils. You can help to decide how local authorities in your part of the region will be reorganised into a single tier. There will be no such reorganisation if an elected Assembly is not established.

with the responses to the question to be (to be marked with a single (X)):

Option A
Option B

== Results ==
On 4 November 2004, in a turnout of almost 48% in an all postal ballot, voters in the North East decisively rejected the proposed regional assembly. The reasons for this result are varied; however, it is felt that the regional power would have been concentrated in an Assembly situated in Newcastle upon Tyne, which given the strong historic rivalries between urban centres in the North-East may have caused resentment from the people of Sunderland and Middlesbrough. Notwithstanding this, in the Newcastle upon Tyne local council area itself the majority of votes cast were against the proposal. It was also felt that not enough of a case had been put forward for the necessity of the Assembly, and it was feared that it would add another layer of politicians and public servants, thereby increasing taxes for the citizens of the areas affected.

=== Assembly question result ===
The referendum result was declared at 00:52 GMT on Friday 5 November 2004 at Crowtree Leisure Centre in Sunderland by the Chief Counting Officer for the North East region Ged Fitzgerald, who was also then Chief Executive of Sunderland City Council.

North East England devolution referendum, 2004; Result
Choice	Votes	%
No	696,519	77.93%
Yes	197,310	22.07%
Valid votes	893,829	98.62%
Invalid or blank votes	12,538	1.38%
Total votes	906,367	100.00 %
Registered voters and turnout	1,899,742	47.71%

Referendum results (excluding invalid votes)
Yes; 197,310 (22.1%)	No; 696,519 (77.9%)
▲50%

=== Results by local council areas ===
Results per councils (yes votes %)

Local authority	Yes votes	No votes	Yes %	No %	Turnout*
Alnwick	2,771	11,666	23.7%	76.3%	57.4%
Berwick-upon-Tweed	2,250	8,597	26.1%	73.9%	52.3%
Blyth Valley	7,523	21,178	35.5%	64.5%	45.5%
Castle Morpeth	4,776	16,952	28.1%	71.9%	57.2%
Chester-le-Street	5,487	15,610	35.1%	64.9%	49.5%
Darlington	4,784	32,282	14.8%	85.2%	49.0%
Derwentside	9,718	22,888	42.4%	57.6%	49.1%
Durham	9,791	24,106	40.6%	59.4%	48.3%
Easington	8,065	21,520	37.4%	62.6%	42.5%
Gateshead	17,011	52,459	32.4%	67.6%	49.3%
Hartlepool	4,887	24,240	20.2%	79.8%	42.9%
Middlesbrough	7,977	33,543	23.8%	76.2%	42.1%
Newcastle upon Tyne	19,984	61,477	32.6%	67.4%	46.4%
North Tyneside	15,203	55,121	27.5%	72.5%	50.7%
Redcar & Cleveland	8,493	43,250	19.7%	80.3%	50.6%
Sedgefield	9,040	23,583	38.3%	61.7%	48.3%
South Tyneside	11,329	41,029	27.6%	72.3%	46.3%
Stockton-on-Tees	11,050	52,040	21.3%	78.7%	48.3%
Sunderland	17,927	71,893	25.0%	75.0%	43.4%
Teesdale	2,020	8,972	22.5%	77.5%	56.9%
Tynedale	5,146	20,975	24.5%	75.5%	55.4%
Wansbeck	5,947	15,503	38.4%	61.6%	46.6%
Wear Valley	6,131	17,635	34.7%	65.3%	49.9%

* Valid and rejected votes divided by electorate.

=== Local government reorganisation question result ===
The related votes in Northumberland and County Durham on local government changes became moot, though new single merged unitary authorities were later established based on the county council areas (i.e. Option A in each case) as part of the 2009 structural changes to local government in England. The votes had been:

County	Option A	Option B	Turnout*
County Durham	89,149	87,050	47.1%
Northumberland	51,560	66,140	50.2%

* Valid and rejected votes divided by electorate.

== Planned referendums in North West England and Yorkshire and the Humber ==
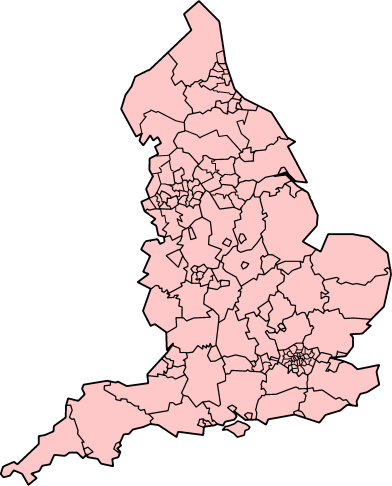
The counties and unitary authorities of England, if "yes" and option 2 is chosen in all referendums.

Similar referendums had been planned in North West England and Yorkshire and the Humber. These were postponed on 22 July due to issues with all-postal ballots – there were many allegations of fraud and procedural irregularities. Following the rejection of the proposal in the north east of England the Deputy Prime Minister John Prescott at the time, ruled out holding further referendums in other regions for the foreseeable future.

=== North West England ===
These were the proposals for local government reorganisation in Northwest England. After the result in North East England the planned referendum for the region was postponed indefinitely and was never put before the electorate.

==== Cheshire ====
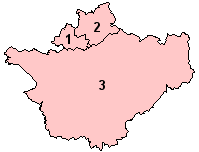
Option 1
1. Halton
2. Warrington
3. Cheshire Council
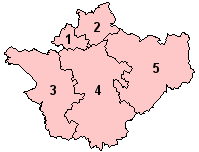
Option 2
1. Halton
2. Warrington
3. Chester and West Cheshire
  (Chester and Ellesmere Port and Neston)
4. Mid Cheshire
  (Vale Royal and Crewe and Nantwich)
5. East Cheshire
  (Congleton and Macclesfield)

==== Cumbria ====
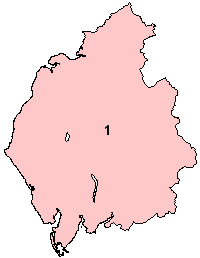
Option 1
1. Cumbria Council
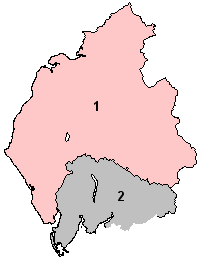
Option 2
1. North Cumbria
  (Allerdale, Carlisle, Copeland and Eden)
2. Morecambe Bay
  (Barrow-in-Furness, South Lakeland, and Lancaster from Lancashire)

==== Lancashire ====
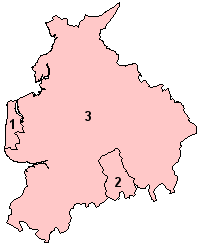
Option 1
1. Blackpool with Fleetwood
  (Blackpool with parts of Wyre)
2. Blackburn with Darwen
3. Lancashire Council
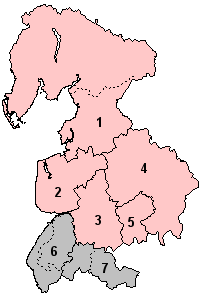
Option 2
1. Morecambe Bay
  (Lancaster with South Lakeland and Barrow-in-Furness from Cumbria)
2. Blackpool and the Fylde
  (Blackpool, Wyre and Fylde)
3. Central Lancashire
  (Preston, South Ribble and Chorley)
4. East Lancashire
  (Burnley, Pendle, Ribble Valley and Rossendale)
5. Blackburn with Hyndburn
  (Blackburn with Darwen and Hyndburn)
6. Sefton and West Lancashire
  (Sefton from Merseyside, with part of West Lancashire)
7. Wigan
  (Wigan from Greater Manchester, with part of West Lancashire)

=== Yorkshire and the Humber ===
These were the proposals for local government reorganisation in the Yorkshire and the Humber region. After the result in North East England the planned referendum was postponed indefinitely and was also never put before the electorate.

==== North Yorkshire ====
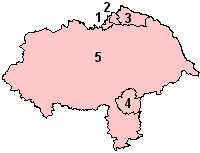
Option 1
1. Stockton-on-Tees
2. Middlesbrough
3. Redcar and Cleveland
4. City of York
5. North Yorkshire Council
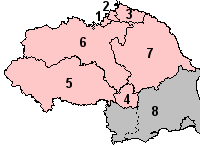
Option 2
1. Stockton-on-Tees
2. Middlesbrough
3. Redcar and Cleveland
4. City of York
5. Craven and Harrogate
6. Hambleton and Richmondshire
7. Ryedale and Scarborough
8. East Riding of Yorkshire
  (existing East Riding of Yorkshire with Selby)

== See also ==
- Referendums in the United Kingdom
- 1998 Greater London Authority referendum
