= Regional development agency =

Regional development bodies in England

In England, regional development agencies (RDAs) were nine non-departmental public bodies established for the purpose of development, primarily economic, of England's Government Office regions between 1998 and 2010. There was one RDA for each of the NUTS level 1 regions of England. Similar activities were carried out in the rest of the United Kingdom, in Wales by the Welsh Government Department of Economy and Transport, in Northern Ireland by the Department of Enterprise, Trade and Investment and in Scotland by Scottish Enterprise and Highlands and Islands Enterprise.

In June 2010 the UK government announced the abolition of the RDAs which took place on 31 March 2012, with a view to reducing the government deficit; similar economic development would be undertaken by local councils and local enterprise partnerships (LEPs). There was no direct replacement for the RDAs as LEPs did not at first receive funding from central government, and local councils did not receive an equivalent injection of income from central funds, having been called upon to make savings and support similar initiatives.

== Background ==
Regional Development Agencies Act 1998 (Note: Section 45.)
- Act of Parliament
- Parliament of the United Kingdom
- Long title: An Act to make provision for regional development agencies in England; to make provision about the Development Commission and the Urban Regeneration Agency; and for connected purposes.
- Citation: 1998 c. 45
- Territorial extent: England and Wales (Note: Section 44.)

Dates
- Royal assent: 19 November 1998
- Commencement: Various (Note: Section 43.)
Other legislation
Amended by	Postal Services Act 2011; Localism Act 2011; Public Bodies Act 2011

Status: Partially repealed

Text of statute as originally enacted

Revised text of statute as amended

Regional development had been a concern of UK policymakers, particularly on the Left, since at least the 1970s. After Labour came to power in the 1997 election, eight RDAs were created on 25 November 1998 following the passing of the Regional Development Agencies Act 1998 (c. 45). In subsequent years their scope and powers were enhanced, and a ninth agency, for London, was established in July 2000. The statutory objectives of the RDAs were:

1. to further economic development and regeneration;
2. to promote business efficiency and competitiveness;
3. to promote employment;
4. to enhance the development and application of skills relevant to employment, and
5. to contribute to sustainable development.

They took over responsibility from Government Offices for administering European Union regional development funds.

== Funding ==
The RDAs were funded from HM Treasury via six central government departments:

- Department for Business, Innovation and Skills
- Department for Communities and Local Government
- Department for Energy and Climate Change
- Department for Environment, Food and Rural Affairs
- Department for Culture, Media and Sport
- UK Trade and Investment

The funding from these departments was pooled, and then allocated to each of the RDAs based on several factors, such as the percentage of people living in deprived areas within the RDA catchment area and the unemployment rate. The total funding, known as the 'Single Pot', was:

- 2006/2007 – £2.244 billion
- 2007/2008 – £2.297 billion
- 2008/2009 – £2.193 billion
- 2009/2010 – £2.260 billion
- 2010/2011 – £1.760 billion

In 2009 a study by accountants PriceWaterhouseCoopers showed that RDAs were generating £1 for the local economy for every £1 of public spending, though this figure was estimated to rise to £4.50 when long-term investments in infrastructure matured.

== Structure ==
Logo of England's Regional Development Agencies

Eight of the nine RDAs reported to the Department for Business, Innovation and Skills (BIS), the exception being the London Development Agency (LDA), which reported directly to the Mayor of London and the London Assembly.

Each RDA was led by a chair and a board of 15 people, appointed by BIS ministers (except in London, where the mayor appointed). The RDA chairs were all business people, while the boards were made up of representatives of business, local government, trade unions and voluntary organisations.

The day-to-day running of the RDA was the responsibility of the Chief Executive who was appointed by the board, subject to approval by BIS ministers (or the London Mayor in the case of the LDA).

== Operation ==
The objectives of the RDAs were set out in the Regional Economic Strategy (RES) of each region. The RES was a document created and maintained by the RDA for the whole region, i.e. it was not simply a document to guide the RDA, it was intended to guide the work of other organisations also. Each RDA updated their RES on a regular basis (approximately every three years) by consulting widely with their partners, and stakeholders in the region, including local government, voluntary organisations, private organisations, and other interested groups. The RES was submitted to the Department for Business, Innovation and Skills for formal approval.

The RDAs sought to achieve their objectives in a variety of ways. The most obvious of these was by funding projects aimed at addressing them, either directly from the RDA, or indirectly through a funded body. Secondly, they sought to influence other stakeholders in the region to take action themselves. Thirdly, they sought to influence the policies of central government where they might impact on the region.

The RDAs worked together in a number of areas, with different RDAs taking the 'lead' role in varying policy areas. Additionally, the RDAs jointly funded a central secretariat to co-ordinate this activity. Finally, the three northern RDAs (Northwest Regional Development Agency, Yorkshire Forward and One NorthEast) collaborated on The Northern Way.

Each RDA had a science and industry council (SIC) made up of business, university and public sector experts. Each SIC advised its RDA on science and innovation investments. Each region had a slightly different focus, but all SICs contributed to the national Technology Strategy (owned by the Technology Strategy Board). This was done via a strategic advisory group on which the chairs of each science and industry council sat.

== Abolition and replacement ==
Following the June 2010 "emergency" budget, the coalition government announced its intention to replace the RDAs by a patchwork of smaller-scale partnerships between local authorities and businesses, known as local enterprise partnerships (LEPs). The RDAs were abolished on 31 March 2012. The RDA for the South West became Regen, a not-for-profit focused on accelerating the transition to clean energy

== List ==
Links to the regional development agencies

The Regional Development Agencies were:

- East of England Development Agency (EEDA), based in Cambridge
- East Midlands Development Agency (EMDA), based in Nottingham
- London Development Agency (LDA)
- One NorthEast (ONE), based in Newcastle
- Northwest Regional Development Agency, based in Warrington
- South West of England Regional Development Agency, based in Exeter
- South East England Development Agency (SEEDA), based in Guildford
- Advantage West Midlands, based in Birmingham
- Yorkshire Forward, based in Leeds

== See also ==
- Regional assembly (England)
