= West Midlands (region) =

Region of England

- Region
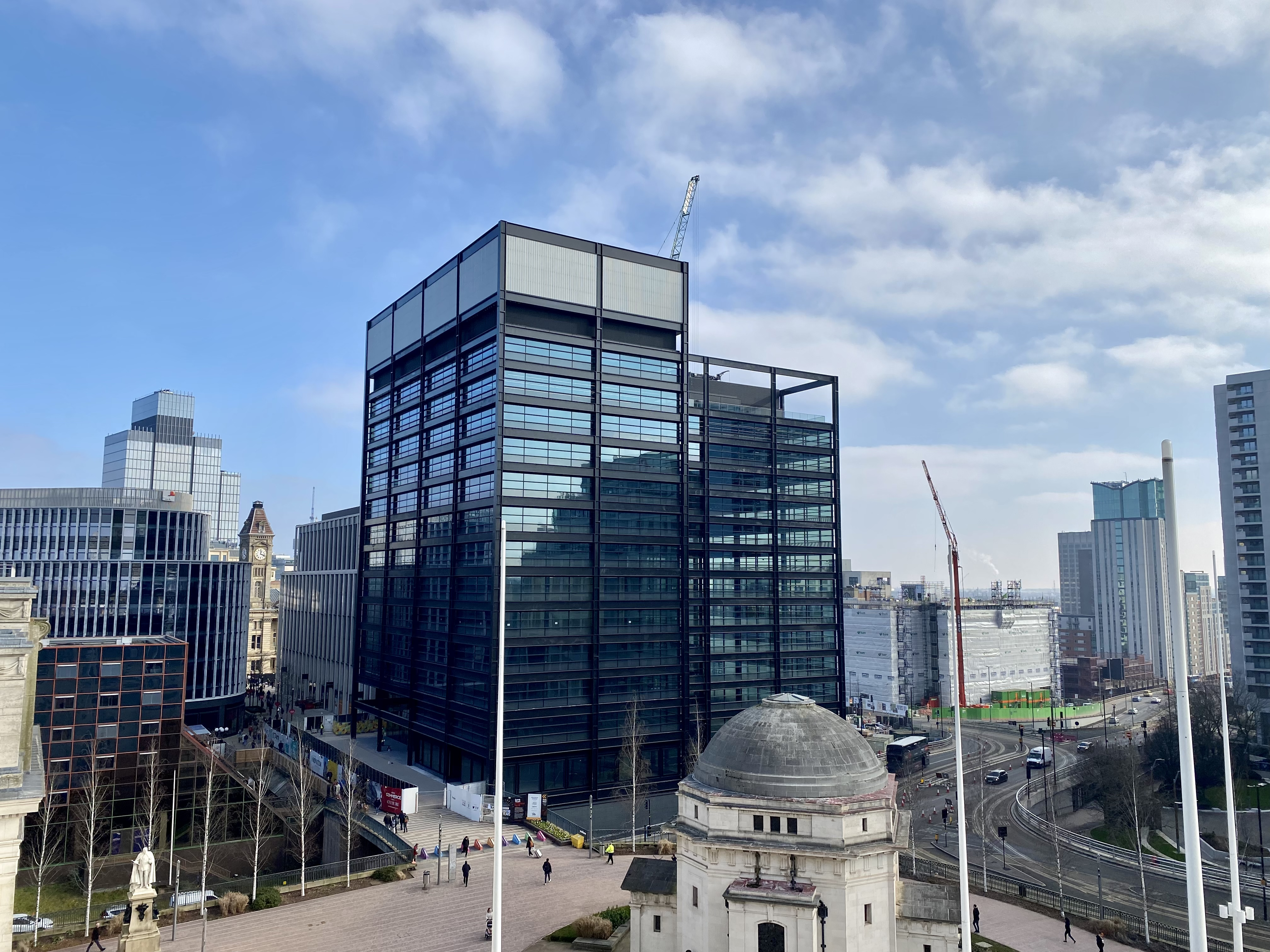
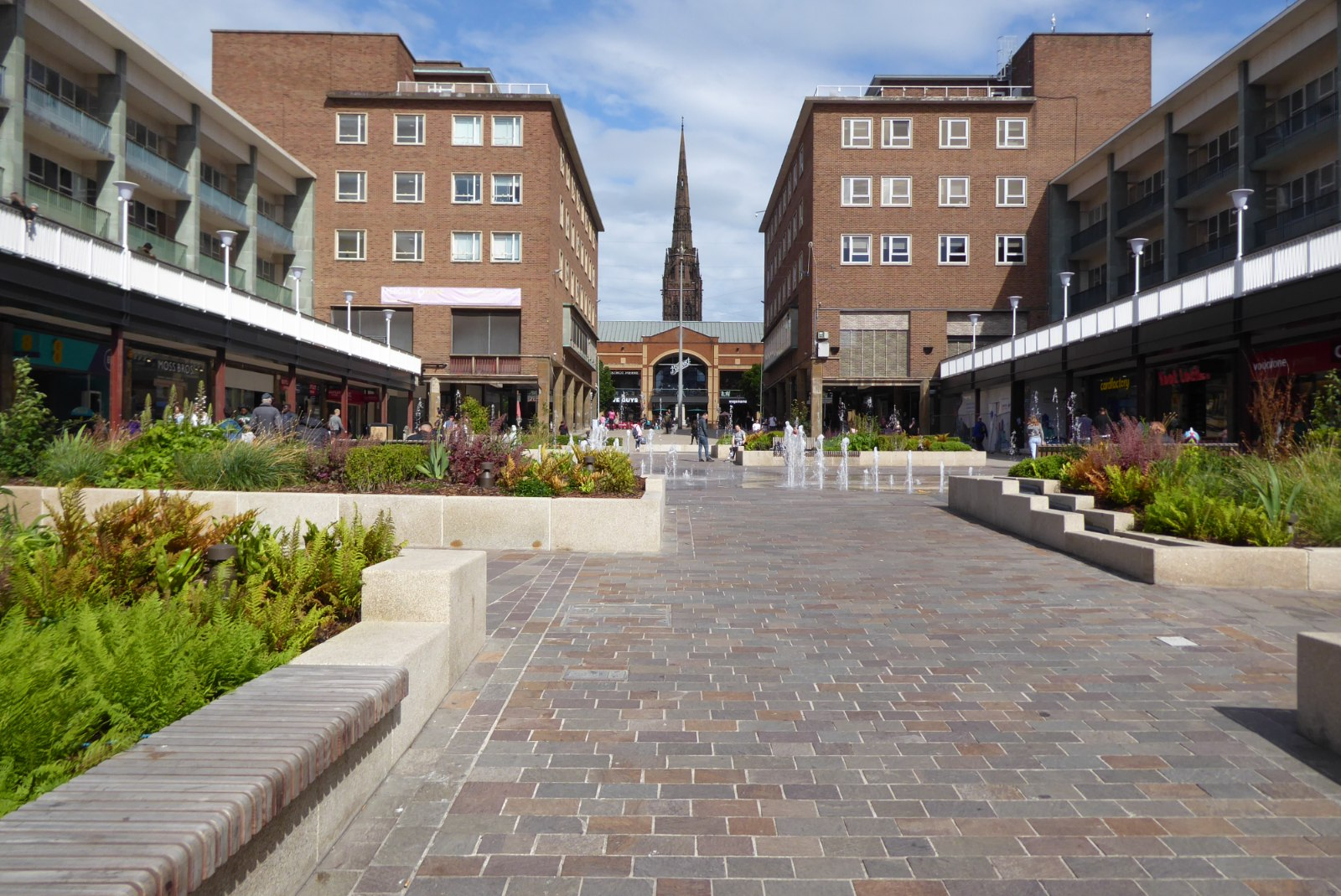
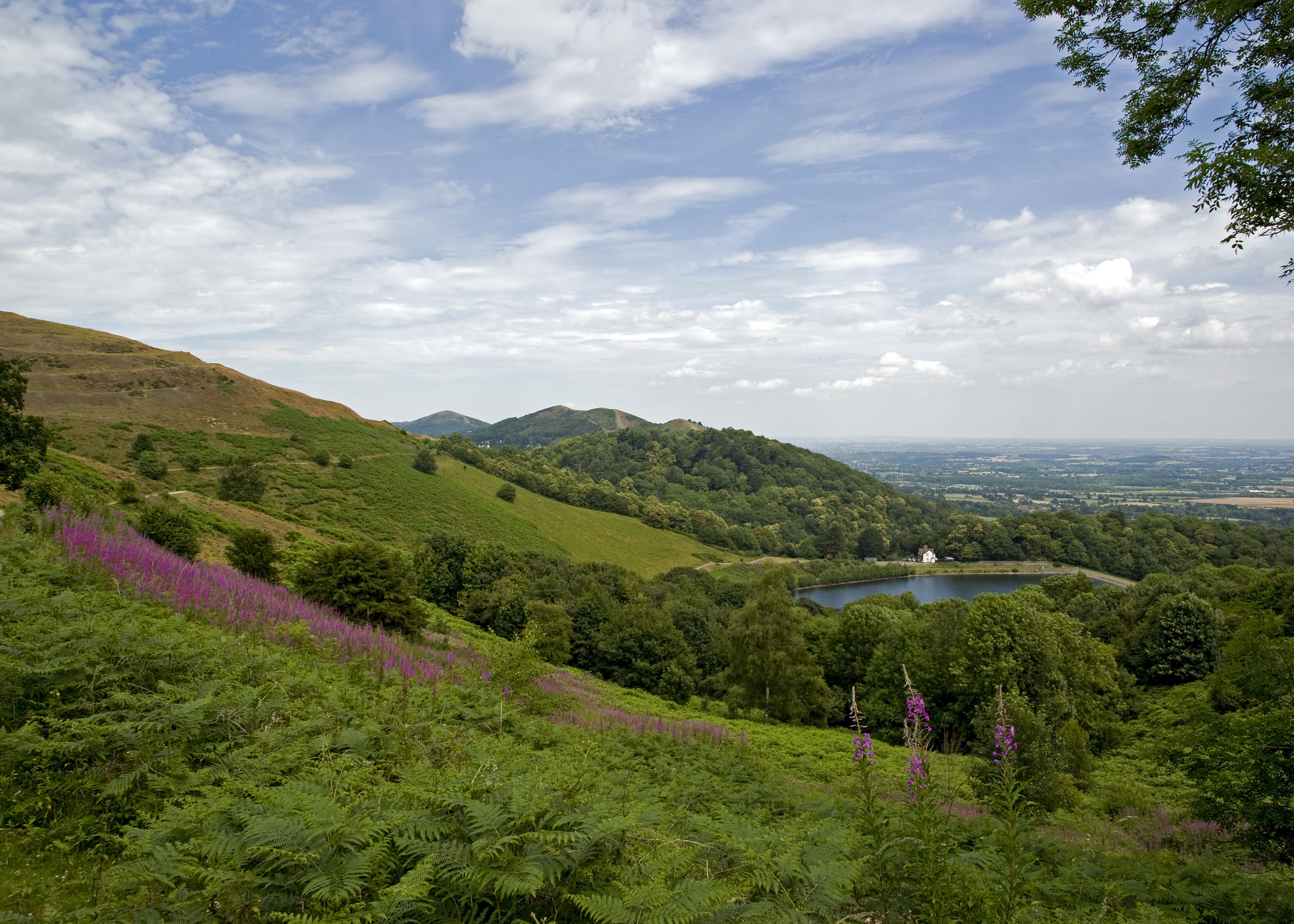
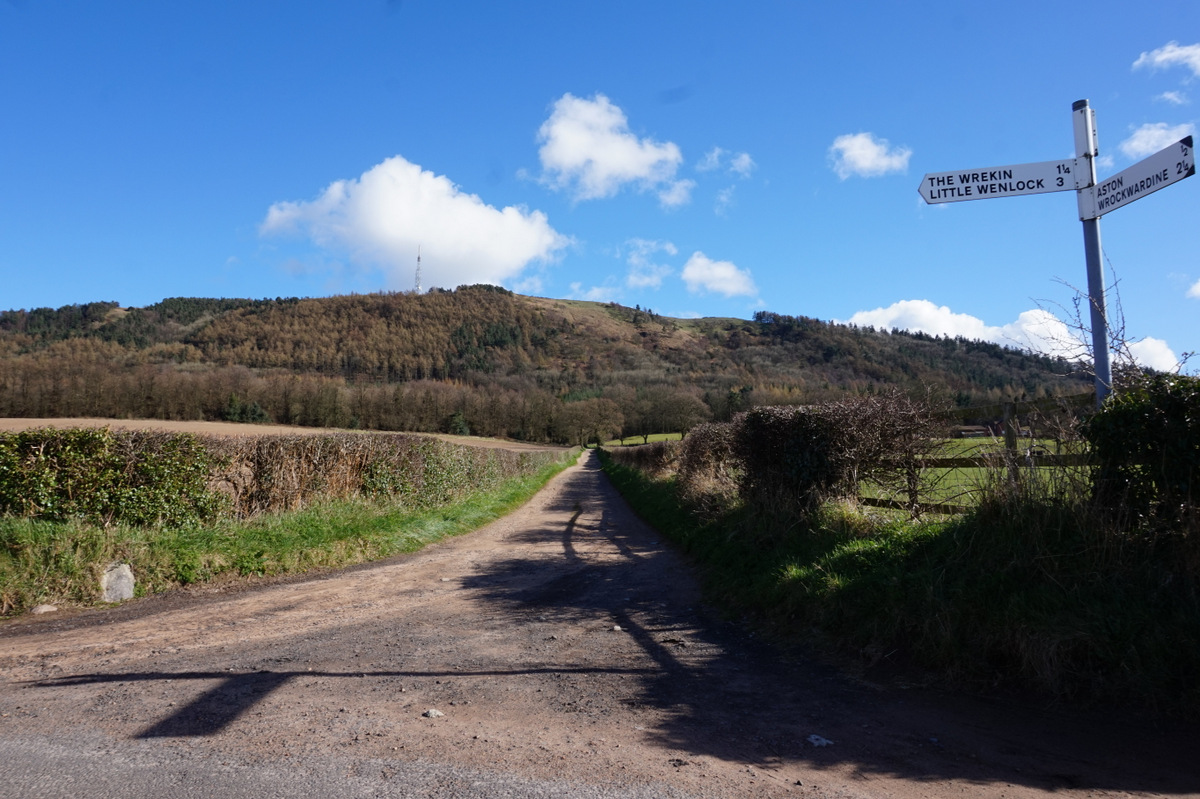
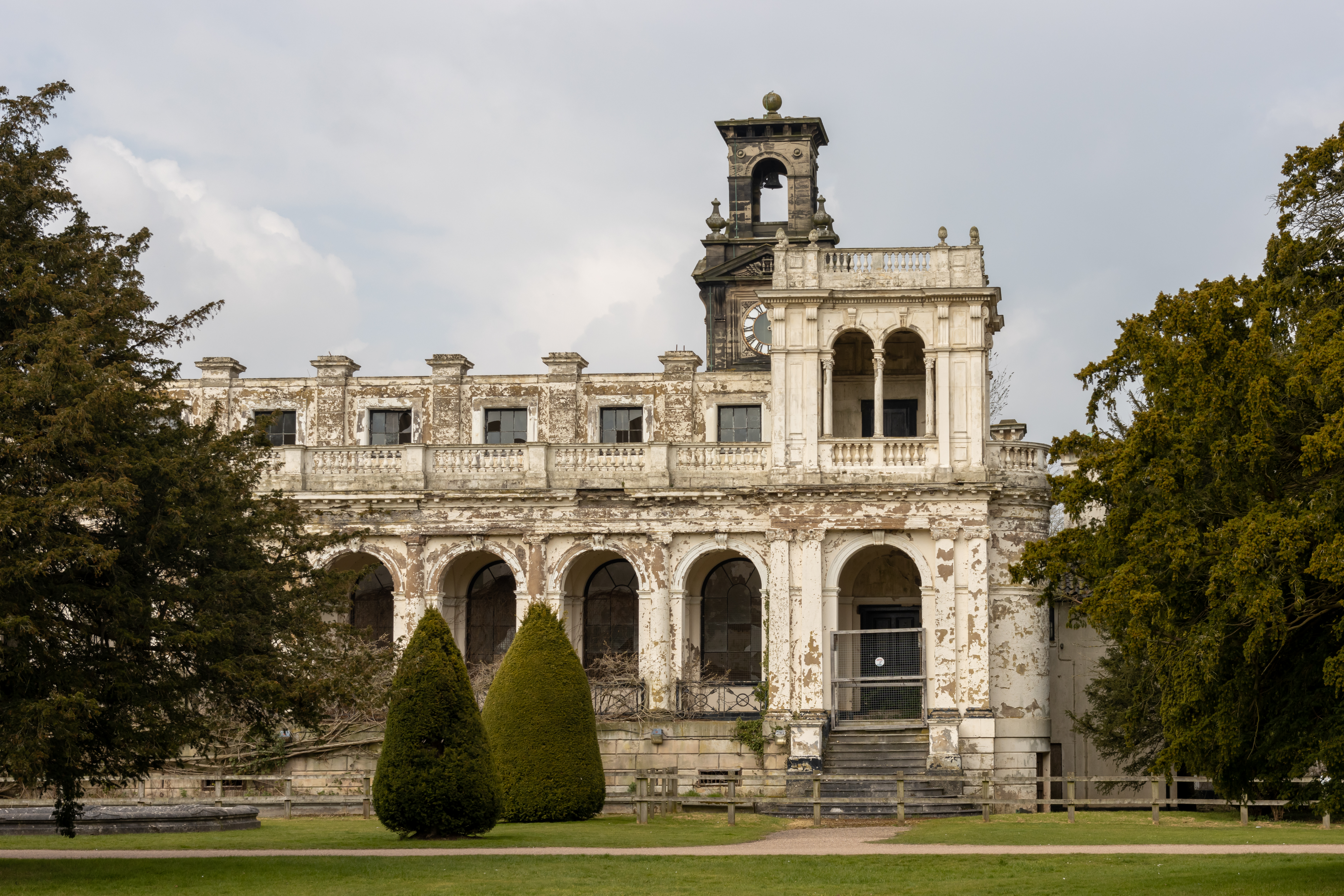
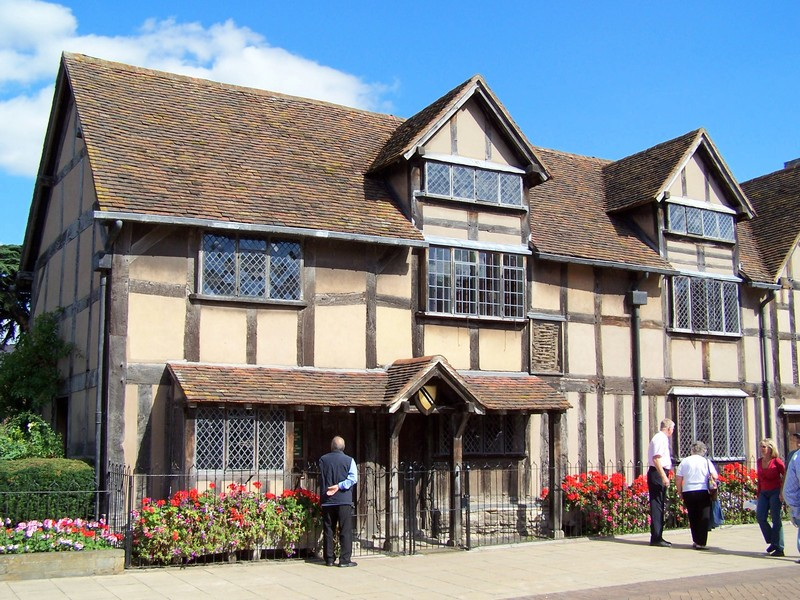
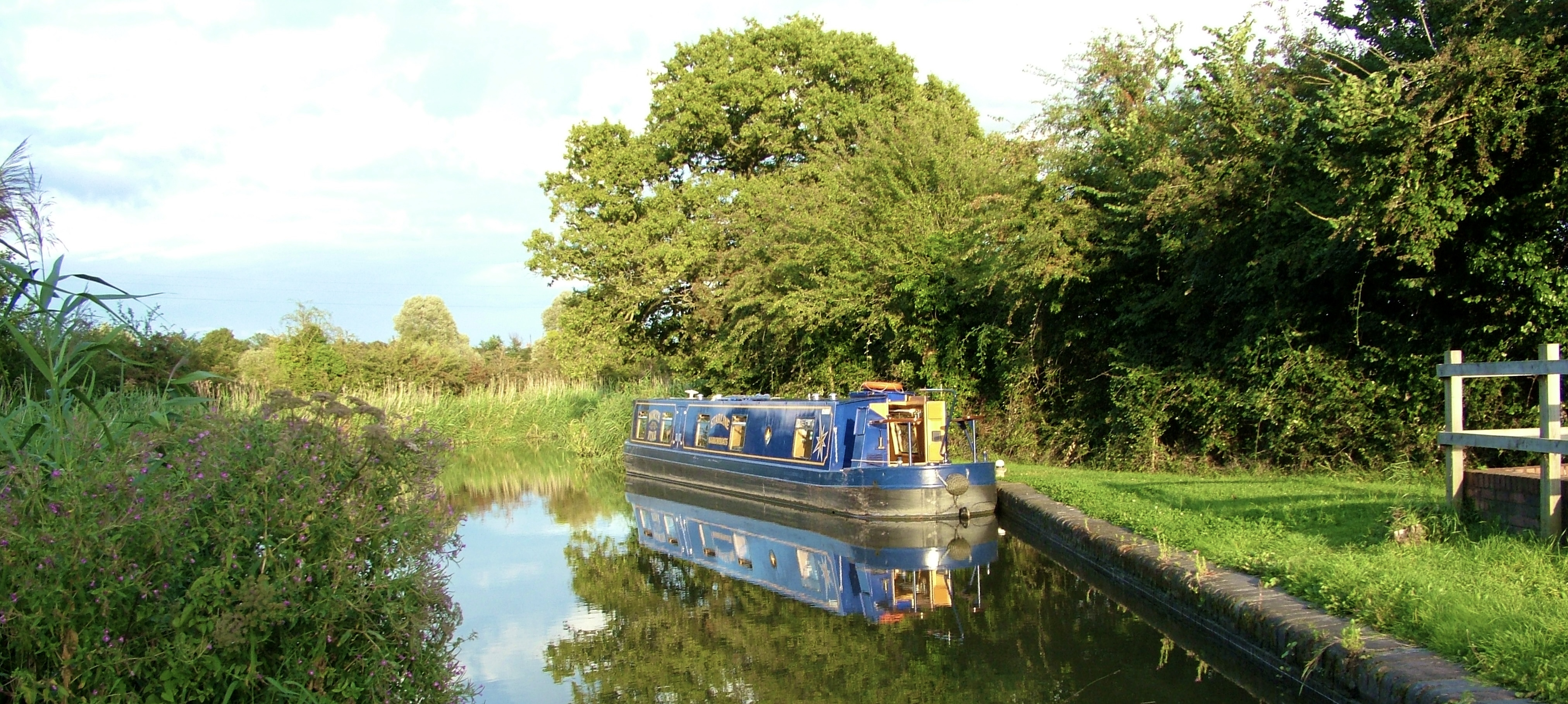
- From top, left to right: Birmingham; Coventry; Malvern Hills; the Wrekin; Trentham Estate; Shakespeare's Birthplace; Droitwich Canal

- West Midlands region shown within England
- Coordinates: 52°28′43.9″N 2°15′22.7″W
- Sovereign state: United Kingdom
- Country: England
- GO established: 1994
- RDA established: 1998
- GO abolished: 2011
- RDA abolished: 31 March 2012
- Subdivisions: 6 counties: Herefordshire; Shropshire; Staffordshire; Warwickshire; West Midlands; Worcestershire; 1 combined authorities: West Midlands; 30 districts: 4 unitary; 7 metropolitan; 19 non-metropolitan in 3 non-metropolitan counties

Government
  - MPs: 57 MPs (of 650)

Area
  - Total: 5,021 sq mi (13,004 km^{2})
  - Land: 5,019 sq mi (12,998 km^{2})
  - Rank: 7th

Population (2025)
  - Total: 6,205,854
  - Rank: 5th
  - Density: 1,240/sq mi (477/km^{2})

Ethnicity (2021)
  - Ethnic groups: List: 77.0% White; 13.3% Asian; 4.5% Black; 3.0% Mixed; 2.1% other

Religion (2021)
  - Religion: List: 46.6% Christianity; 32.9% no religion; 9.6% Islam; 2.9% Sikhism; 1.5% Hinduism; 0.3% Buddhism; 0.1% Judaism; 0.5% other; 5.7% not stated
- Time zone: UTC+0 (GMT)
  - Summer (DST): UTC+1 (BST)
- ITL code: TLG
- GSS code: E12000005

The West Midlands is one of nine official regions of England at the first level of International Territorial Level for statistical purposes. It covers the western half of the area known traditionally as the Midlands. The region consists of the counties of Herefordshire, Shropshire, Staffordshire, Warwickshire, West Midlands and Worcestershire. The region has seven cities: Birmingham, Coventry, Hereford, Lichfield, Stoke-on-Trent, Wolverhampton and Worcester.

The West Midlands region is geographically diverse, from the urban central areas of the West Midlands conurbation to the rural counties of Herefordshire, Shropshire which border Wales, and Worcestershire. The region is landlocked; however, the longest river in the UK, the River Severn, traverses the region south-eastwards, flowing through the county towns of Shrewsbury and Worcester, and the Ironbridge Gorge, a UNESCO World Heritage Site. Staffordshire is home to the industrialised Potteries conurbation, including the city of Stoke-on-Trent and the Staffordshire Moorlands area, which borders the south-eastern Peak District National Park near Leek. The region also encompasses five Areas of Outstanding Natural Beauty: the Wye Valley, Shropshire Hills, Cannock Chase, Malvern Hills and parts of the Cotswolds. Warwickshire is home to the towns of Stratford upon Avon, birthplace of writer William Shakespeare; Rugby, the birthplace of Rugby football; and Nuneaton, birthplace to author George Eliot.

== Geography ==
The official region contains the ceremonial counties of Herefordshire, Shropshire, Staffordshire, Warwickshire, West Midlands and Worcestershire.

There is some confusion in the use of the term "West Midlands", as the name is also used for the much smaller West Midlands county and West Midlands conurbation which is in the central belt of the Midlands and on the eastern side of the West Midlands Region. It is also still used by various organisations within that area, such as West Midlands Police and West Midlands Fire Service.

The highest point in the region is Black Mountain, at 703 metres (2,307 ft) in west Herefordshire on the border with Powys, Wales. The region contains five Areas of Outstanding Natural Beauty (AONBs), including the Shropshire Hills, Malvern Hills and Cannock Chase, and parts of the Wye Valley and Cotswolds. The Peak District National Park also stretches into north Staffordshire.

=== Towns and cities ===
Major towns and cities in the West Midlands region include:

Bold indicates city status.

Population > 1,000,000

- **Birmingham**, WMS

Population > 300,000

- **Coventry**, WMS

Population > 200,000

- **Stoke-on-Trent**, STS
- **Wolverhampton**, WMS

Population > 100,000

- Solihull, WMS
- Telford, SHR
- West Bromwich, WMS
- **Worcester**, WOR

Population > 50,000

- Burton-upon-Trent, STS
- Dudley, WMS
- Halesowen, WMS
- **Hereford**, HER
- Kidderminster, WOR
- Leamington Spa, WAR
- Newcastle-under-Lyme, STS
- Nuneaton, WAR
- Redditch, WOR
- Rugby, WAR
- Shrewsbury, SHR
- Smethwick, WMS
- Stafford, STS
- Stourbridge, WMS
- Sutton Coldfield, WMS
- Tamworth, STS
- Walsall, WMS

Population > 25,000

- Aldridge, WMS
- Bedworth, WAR
- Bilston, WMS
- Bloxwich, WMS
- Bromsgrove, WOR
- Burntwood, STS
- Cannock, STS
- Darlaston, WMS
- Droitwich Spa, WOR
- Evesham, WOR
- Kingswinford, WMS
- **Lichfield**, STS
- Malvern, WOR
- Oldbury, WMS
- Rowley Regis, WMS
- Stratford-upon-Avon, WAR
- Tipton, WMS
- Warwick, WAR
- Wednesbury, WMS
- Willenhall, WMS

Population > 10,000

- Atherstone, WAR
- Biddulph, STS
- Brierley Hill, WMS
- Bridgnorth, SHR
- Cheadle, STS
- Hednesford. STS
- Kenilworth, WAR
- Kidsgrove, STS
- Leek, STS
- Leominster, HER
- Ludlow, SHR
- Market Drayton, SHR
- Newport, SHR
- Oswestry, SHR
- Ross-on-Wye, HER
- Rugeley, STS
- Sedgley, WMS
- Stone, STS
- Stourport-on-Severn, WOR
- Uttoxeter, STS
- Whitchurch, SHR
- Whitnash, WAR
- Wombourne, STS

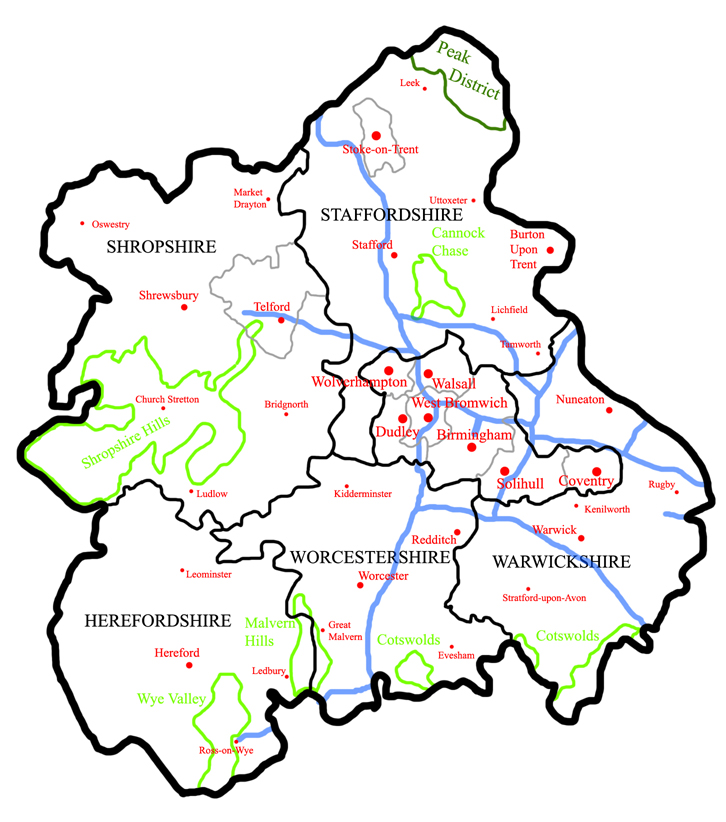
Map of the West Midlands region Legend: Town or city; Ceremonial county; Unitary authority or metropolitan borough; Motorway; Area of Outstanding Natural Beauty; National park

=== Urban areas ===
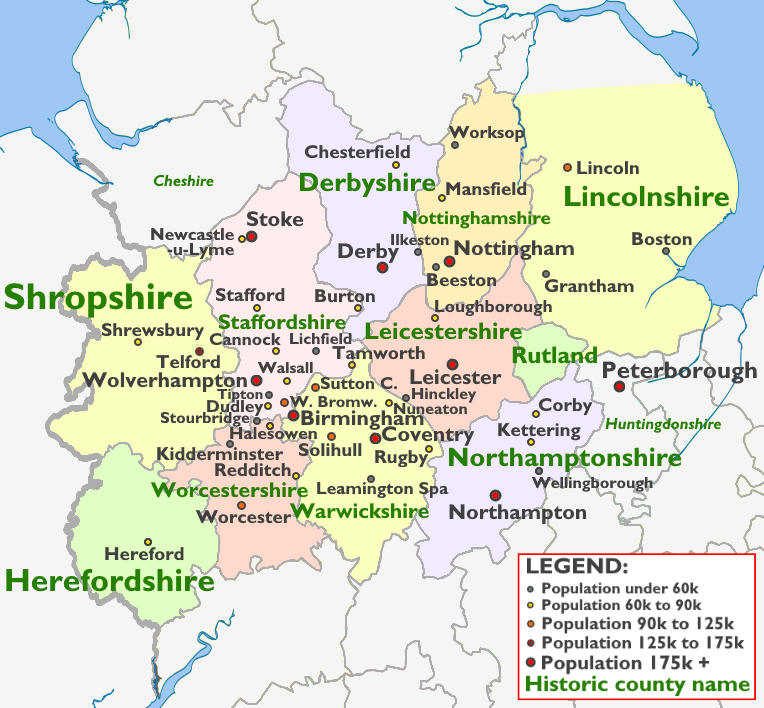
The West Midlands is considerably more densely populated than the East Midlands, as can be seen on this map of cities and towns throughout the Midlands.

The West Midlands region contains several urban areas with populations of 100,000 or more in 2021, which include:

- **West Midlands conurbation** (includes Birmingham, Wolverhampton, Solihull, Sutton Coldfield, Dudley, West Bromwich and Walsall.) (Pop: 2,594,803)
- **Coventry and Bedworth urban area** (includes Coventry, Bedworth and Binley Woods.) (Pop: 389,603)
- **Stoke-on-Trent built-up area** (includes Stoke-on-Trent, Newcastle-under-Lyme and Kidsgrove) (Pop: 382,687)
- **Telford** (Pop: 161,170)
- **Worcester** (Pop: 107,082)
- **Royal Leamington Spa Built-up area** (includes Leamington Spa, Warwick, Whitnash, Cubbington) (pop: 102,972)
- **Nuneaton built-up area** (includes Nuneaton, Bulkington, Hartshill) (pop: 100,710)

== Modern history ==
=== Second World War ===
The RAF Fauld explosion on 27 November 1944 in east Staffordshire produced a 100-foot deep crater, and is the UK's largest explosion, being caused by around 4,000 tonnes of high explosive, and may be the world's largest non-nuclear explosion.

Birmingham was the third most bombed city in the UK after London and Liverpool; Spitfires were built in Castle Bromwich, Lancasters at Austin's works in Longbridge at Cofton Hackett, and the Birmingham Small Arms Company at Small Heath produced the M1919 Browning machine gun. Boulton Paul Aircraft had their main aircraft factory in the north of Wolverhampton. RAF Defford, in the south of Worcestershire between Pershore and Croome Park, was where many important airborne radars were developed, such as H2S (radar) and anti-submarine radars.

=== Scientific heritage ===
Thomas Wedgwood, son of Josiah Wedgwood, discovered the first photo-sensitive (light-sensitive) chemicals – silver nitrate and silver chloride in the 1790s.

Sir Norman Lockyer of Rugby discovered helium in 1868, for which he used electromagnetic spectroscopy.

Edward Weston of Oswestry, who emigrated to the US, built the first accurate voltmeter in the late 1880s, and the Weston cell in 1893.

Francis W. Aston of Harborne, educated at the University of Birmingham, developed mass spectrometry in 1919, which helped him to identify the first isotopes, receiving the Nobel Prize for Chemistry in 1922.

Dennis Gabor invented holography at British Thomson-Houston in Rugby in 1947, receiving the Nobel Prize for Physics in 1971.

James Glaisher in 1862 took a record balloon flight with Henry Tracey Coxwell for the BAAS near Wolverhampton. They reached 29,000 feet (8,800 m) the composition of the Earth's atmosphere until then was not understood; the altitude records for the UK have not been exceeded since; Project Excelsior in the US in 1960 would later reach 20 miles (110,000 ft).

Philip Lawley of Burton upon Trent was first person to realise that chemical damage to DNA caused cancer (at the Chester Beatty Research Institute in London) in the early 1960s.

Francis Galton (d. 1911) of the Darwin–Wedgwood family's Birmingham branch was an early eugenicist rooted in improving animal breeding stock and examining heredity. He invented terms eugenics and nature versus nurture. His limited calls for human eugenics were widened by the German Society for Racial Hygiene in 1905 founded by Alfred Ploetz, which coupled with the racial superiority fallacies of Aryanism reached its nadir in genocidal antisemitism. Moral teachings and inherent repulsions towards human eugenics were overcome by a minority of those in power espousing racial equality; European media and leaders lamented loss of Empire, advocated ultranationalism and prized military physical advantage; Galton saw human eugenics as part of all means to do better.

=== Industrial heritage ===
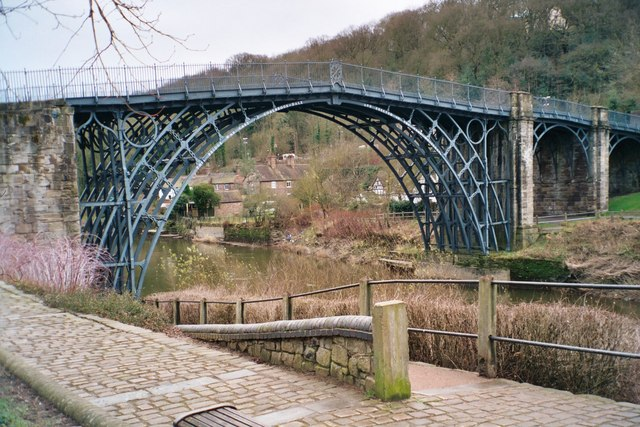
The cast iron Iron Bridge at Coalbrookdale, opened in January 1781, was the first large-scale object made out of cast iron; but cast iron is not reliably strong due to impurities. Wrought iron, where the carbon is hammered to remove the carbon and impurities is much stronger; the first large-scale wrought iron bridge was the Britannia Bridge over the Menai Strait, only possible due to its innovative box girder design by Robert Stephenson.

Much of the Industrial Revolution in the United Kingdom began in Birmingham and the Black Country area of West Midlands. The Industrial Revolution is thought to have begun when Abraham Darby substituted coke in the place of charcoal to smelt iron, at his Old Furnace. The Black Country may be regarded as the world's first industrial landscape, while nearby Ironbridge Gorge claims to be the Birthplace of Industry. The world's first cast iron bridge in 1779 spans the Gorge. The first self-propelled locomotive to run on rails in 1803 at Coalbrookdale, was built by Richard Trevithick. The first iron rails for horse-drawn transport, were made at Coalbrookdale in 1768 by Richard Reynolds at Ketley Ironworks. Iron rails only became widely successful in 1820 when made out of wrought iron at Bedlington Ironworks in north-east England.

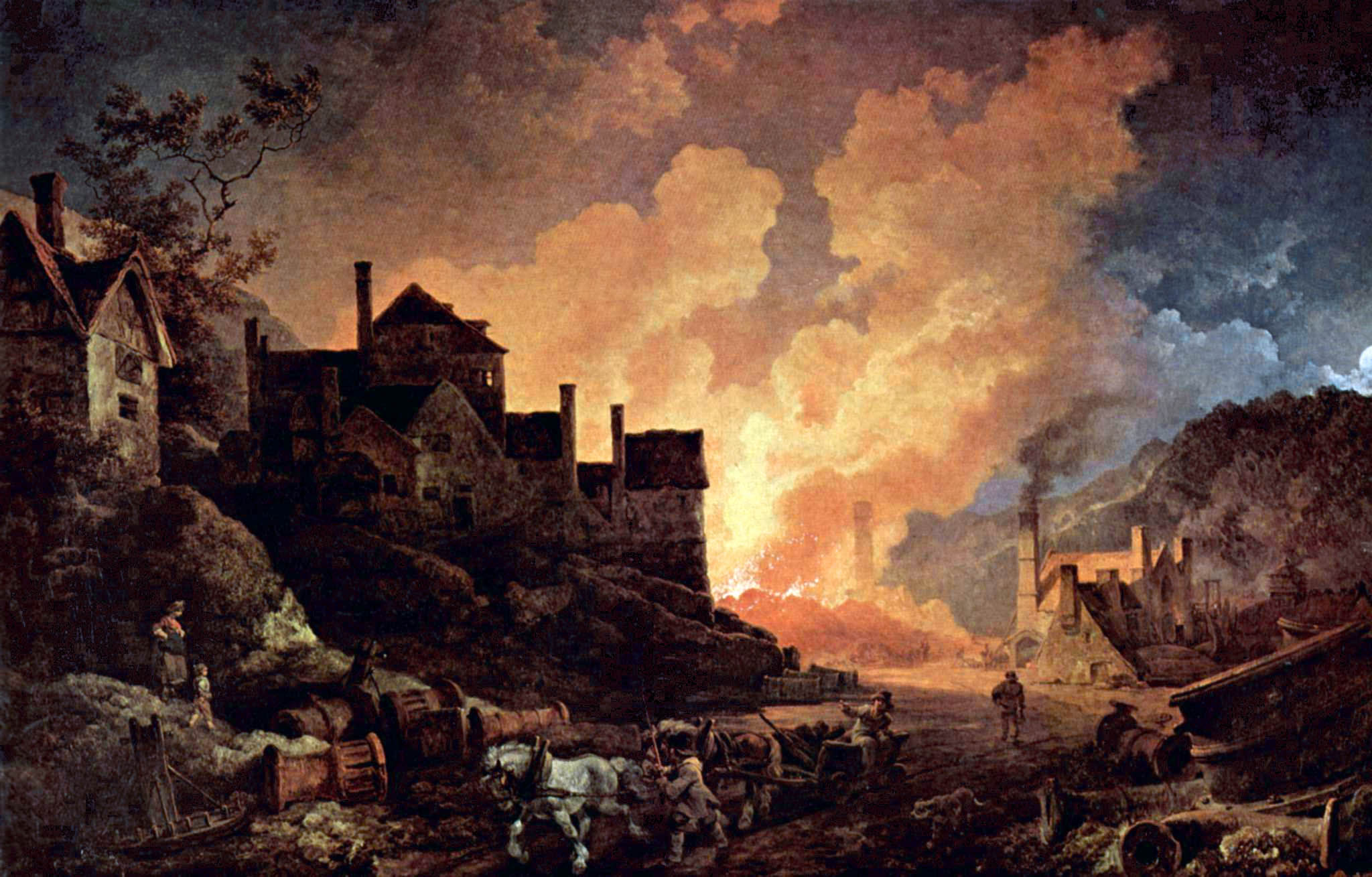
Coalbrookdale by Night, of the Madeley Wood Company, painted by Philip James de Loutherbourg in 1801

Birmingham's industrial development was triggered by discussions at the Lunar Society of Birmingham at Soho House, Boulton's house, and products were carried along the BCN Main Line canal. Soho Manufactory was the first man-made-powered factory in world. Chance Brothers of Smethwick built the glass for The Crystal Palace in 1851. Smethwick Engine, now at Thinktank, Birmingham Science Museum, is the oldest working steam engine, made in 1779, and is the oldest working engine in the world. Smethwick was a main centre for making lighthouse lanterns.

Valor Fires in Erdington developed the first radiant gas fire in 1967, a balanced flue fire in 1973, and a natural flame gas fire in 1978. The Erdington site, owned by Iceland's BDR Thermea, closed in May 2012. The company also built gas cookers; since 2011 the company has been part of Glen Dimplex, who have a site at Cooper's Bank, south of Gornalwood.

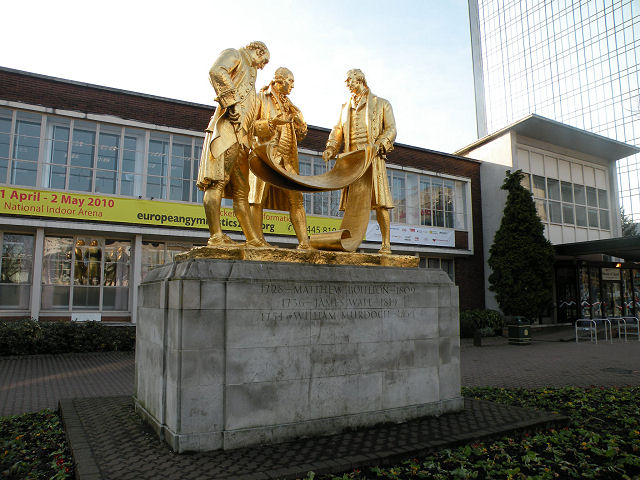
Boulton, Watt and Murdoch, a 1956 statue on Broad Street in Birmingham; the SI unit of power is the watt, most commonly found as the kW, a replacement for the imperial measurement of horsepower.

Ditherington Flax Mill in Shrewsbury was the first iron-framed building in the world in 1797. Thomas Bolton & Sons of Froghall, Staffordshire, made the world's first transatlantic telegraph cable in 1857, having supplied a submarine cable across the English Channel in 1850. On 10 July 1890, a trunk circuit telephone line was opened between London and Birmingham by the National Telephone Company; for the first time this allowed phone calls between the London and the north. The world's first coaxial cable was laid between London and Birmingham in 1936 to give 40 channels for telephone traffic. and brought into use in 1938, later extended to Manchester in 1940.

Alexander Parkes invented the first man-made plastic (thermoplastic) in Birmingham in 1856. Princess Square, Wolverhampton, was the site of Britain's first traffic lights in 1927. Infrared cameras were developed at the Royal Radar Establishment in Malvern (with EMI Electronics) in 1967. The world's first Maglev train operated at Birmingham Airport in 1983. The tallest freestanding structure in the region was the chimney of Ironbridge power station at 673 ft. John Baskerville of Birmingham, a former stone carver, largely invented fonts, or typefaces, for printing.

Much of the UK's car industry would be centred in Coventry and Birmingham; most of this has now gone. Midland Motor Cylinder (part of Birmid Industries) of Smethwick was the largest producer of automobile cylinder blocks in Europe. Fort Dunlop was Europe's largest tyre plant. Metro-Cammell in Birmingham made most of the 1970s and 1980s London Underground trains. MG Rover (a company of Rover) closed in 2005 (from 1885), The Ryton plant, which made the Peugeot 206, closed at the end of 2006, with production moving to Trnava in Slovakia, and some to a plant at Kolín in the Czech Republic. Alfred Herbert of Coventry was the largest machine-tool manufacturer in the UK for many decades; it was brought down in the 1970s by advancing technology overseas, and complacent strategic decisions of the management, finally closing in 1982; many Midlands manufacturing companies followed similar fates in the 1970s and 1980s.

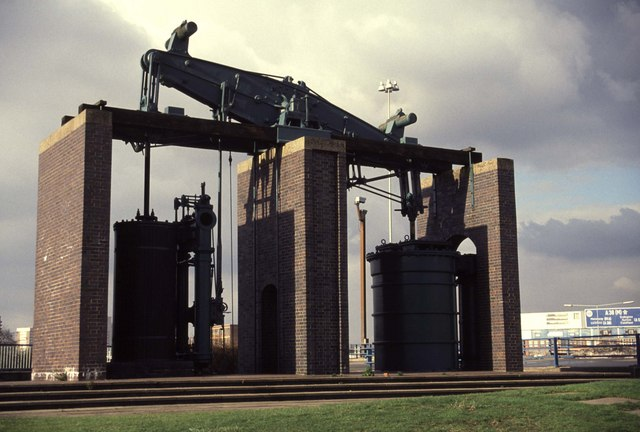
1817 Boulton & Watt beam blowing engine re-erected on the Dartmouth Circus roundabout, on the A4540 Middleway and the A38(M)

Henry Wiggin & Co of Hereford developed the metal alloys necessary for other Midlands' (and beyond) automotive and aerospace companies – Inconel, Incoloy and Nimonic. It was the lack of vanadium for high-melting point alloys, caused by Royal Navy action, that prevented German Me 262 engines being serviceable; had German Second World War engineers had a greater supply of vanadium and molybdenum, the engine life (around 12 hours maximum, from entering service in April 1944 to the end of the war) of their jet engine would have increased much more, which would have been significant to the war's outcome. Bristol Siddeley developed the rocket engines for Black Arrow at Ansty; in fact all of R-R's rocket engines were developed and built there at R-R's Industrial and Marine Gas Turbine Division; Britain's smaller rocket engines for missiles were built by Bristol Aerojet in what is now North Somerset. High Duty Alloys at Redditch constructed (forged) the compressor and turbine blades for Whittle's first engines, and many of the early jet engines; it made Concorde's airframe from the Hiduminium R.R.58 aluminium alloy.

Maxaret, the world's first ABS braking system, was invented in Coventry by Dunlop in the early 1950s for aircraft; John Boyd Dunlop was a Scottish vet who had first produced the first pneumatic tyres in 1889. Matthew Piers Watt Boulton, grandson of Matthew Boulton, and born in the area, invented the aileron, an important flight control surface in 1868, decades before the first actual flight. Triumph Engineering was a famous motorbike firm in Meriden. About a quarter of all British WWI planes were built in Coventry. The Jensen Interceptor FF was the first production four-wheel-drive car in the world, designed by Major Tony Rolt, and built at their factory in West Bromwich.

Cadbury launched Dairy Milk in 1905, Bournville in 1906, Fruit & Nut in 1928, Whole Nut in 1930, Cadbury Roses in 1938, and the Cadbury Creme Egg in 1971. George and Richard Cadbury built their factory in 1879 and Bournville in 1893, named after the Bourn brook. Iceland (supermarket) opened its first store in Oswestry in 1970 – heralding the onset of frozen food in the UK. Alfred Bird invented egg-free custard in 1837 in Birmingham – accidentally given to guests at his home, being created as his wife had an allergy to eggs; he then invented baking powder in 1843 as his wife also had an allergy to yeast.

=== Culture ===
J. R. R. Tolkien grew up in Birmingham, Kings Heath, then part of Worcestershire, and was inspired by Moseley Bog and Sarehole, and perhaps by the Perrott's Folly. Philip Larkin came from Coventry. Rowland Hill (stamps) was from Kidderminster. The writer George Eliot came from Nuneaton. Anthony E. Pratt from Birmingham invented Cluedo.

Frederick Gibberd of Coventry designed Liverpool Metropolitan Cathedral. Edward Cave from Rugby made Britain's first magazine in 1731 – The Gentleman's Magazine. Philip Astley from Newcastle-under-Lyme invented the modern day circus in 1768 – Astley's Amphitheatre.

The Castlemorton Common Festival in May 1992 near Malvern, led to the Criminal Justice and Public Order Act 1994.

The Nowka Bais is a Bengali boat racing festival which takes place annually in Birmingham. It is a cultural event in the West Midlands, United Kingdom attracting not only the Bangladeshi diaspora but a variety of cultures. It is also the largest kind of boat race in the United Kingdom.

== Demographics ==
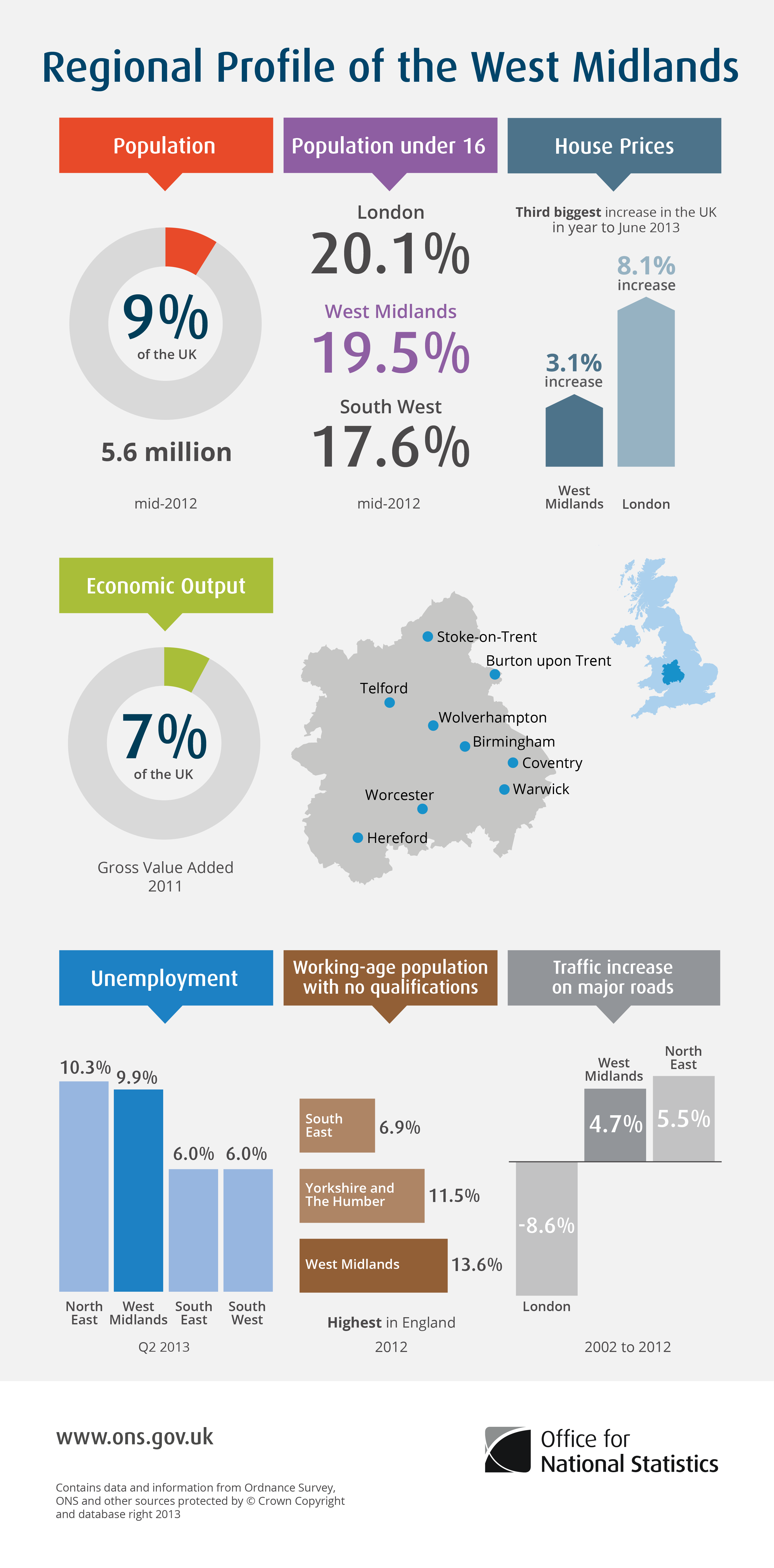
Regional profile of the West Midlands in 2011

Relative population map.

Total West Midlands population (wikidata:Q48038) = 5,602,000 (2011)
(WD = Wikidata page)

[Hide/show county populations]
	West Midlands	pop.
1	Herefordshire	193,615^{WD}
2	Shropshire	506,737^{WD}
3	Staffordshire	1,139,794^{WD}
4	Warwickshire	607,604^{WD}
5	West Midlands (county)	2,939,927^{WD}
6	Worcestershire	609,216^{WD}

200pxPopulation pyramid in 2020

=== Religion ===
Religion in the West Midlands
Religion	2021		2011		2001	
Religion	Number	%	Number	%	Number	%
Christianity	2,770,559	46.6%	3,373,450	60.2%	3,823,235	72.6%
Islam	569,963	9.6%	376,152	6.7%	216,184	4.1%
Sikhism	172,398	2.9%	133,681	2.4%	103,870	2.0%
Hinduism	88,116	1.5%	72,247	1.3%	56,668	1.1%
Buddhism	18,804	0.3%	16,649	0.3%	9,760	0.2%
Judaism	4,394	0.07%	4,621	0.08%	4,977	0.09%
Other religion	31,805	0.5%	25,654	0.5%	10,895	0.2%
No religion	1,955,003	32.9%	1,230,910	22.0%	647,718	12.3%
Religion not stated	339,714	5.7%	368,483	6.6%	394,001	7.5%
Total population	5,950,756	100%	5,601,847	100%	5,267,308	100%

=== Ethnicity ===
Population pyramid of the West Midlands by ethnicity in 2021

UK born and foreign born population pyramid in the West Midlands in 2021

The West Midlands is the second most ethnically diverse region of the UK (London being the most diverse). This is in large part due to the West Midlands conurbation, which is highly diverse. The ethnic makeup of the West Midlands as a whole as measured by the 2011 census was as follows:

Ethnic group	1981 estimations		1991		2001		2011		2021	
Ethnic group	Number	%	Number	%	Number	%	Number	%	Number	%
White: Total	4,716,950	93.5%	4,725,824	91.8%	4,674,296	88.74%	4,633,669	82.7%	4,585,024	77%
White: British	–	–	–	–	4,537,892	86.15%	4,434,333	79.2%	4,275,557	71.8%
White: Irish	–	–	–	–	73,136	1.38%	55,216	1.0%	47,886	0.8%
White: Irish Traveller/Gypsy	–	–	–	–	–	–	4,734	0.1%	6,207	0.1%
White: Roma	–	–	–	–	–	–	–	–	6,809	0.1%
White: Other	–	–	–	–	63,268	1.2%	139,386	2.5%	248,565	4.2%
Asian or Asian British: Total	–	–	297,829	5.8%	401,672	7.62%	604,435	10.8%	794,264	13.4%
Asian or Asian British: Indian	–	–	158,731	3.1%	178,691	3.39%	218 439	3.9%	276,030	4.6%
Asian or Asian British: Pakistani	–	–	98,612	1.9%	154,550	2.93%	227,248	4.1%	319,165	5.4%
Asian or Asian British: Bangladeshi	–	–	19,415	0.4%	31,401	0.59%	52,477	0.9%	77,518	1.3%
Asian or Asian British: Chinese	–	–	9,588	0.2%	16,099	0.3%	31,274	0.6%	33,301	0.6%
Asian or Asian British: Asian Other	–	–	11,483	0.2%	20,931	0.39%	74,997	1.3%	88,250	1.5%
Black or Black British: Total	–	–	102,206	2%	104,032	1.97%	182,125	3.3%	269,019	4.6%
Black or Black British: African	–	–	5,305	0.1%	11,985	0.22%	64,253	1.2%	146,089	2.5%
Black or Black British: Caribbean	–	–	78,082	1.5%	82,282	1.56%	86,794	1.6%	90,192	1.5%
Black or Black British: Other	–	–	18,819	0.4%	9,765	0.18%	31,078	0.6%	32,738	0.6%
Mixed: Total	–	–	–	–	73,225	1.39%	131,714	2.4%	178,224	3.1%
Mixed: White and Caribbean	–	–	–	–	39,782	0.75%	68,533	1.2%	81,193	1.4%
Mixed: White and African	–	–	–	–	3,683	–	9,232	0.2%	16,011	0.3%
Mixed: White and Asian	–	–	–	–	18,160	0.34%	32,561	0.6%	46,478	0.8%
Mixed: Other Mixed	–	–	–	–	11,600	0.22%	21,388	0.4%	34,542	0.6%
Other: Total	–	–	24,328	0.47%	14,083	0.26%	49,904	0.9%	124,226	2.1%
Other: Arab	–	–	–	–	–	–	18,079	0.3%	31,790	0.5%
Other: Any other ethnic group	–	–	24,328	0.47%	14,083	0.26%	31,825	0.6%	92,436	1.6%
Non-White: Total	326,523	6.5%	424,363	8.2%	593,012	11.3%	968,178	17.3%	1,365,733	23%
Total	5,043,473	100%	5,150,187	100%	5,267,308	100%	5,601,847	100%	5,950,757	100%

=== Teenage pregnancy ===
For top-tier authorities in the West Midlands, Stoke-on-Trent has the highest teenage pregnancy rate. For council districts, Nuneaton and Bedworth in Warwickshire has the highest rate closely followed by Tamworth. For top-tier authorities, Shropshire has the lowest rate, and for council districts Malvern Hills has the lowest rate.

=== Social deprivation ===
The region, from studies of multiple deprivation, shows similarities with Yorkshire and the Humber, and is more deprived than the neighbouring East Midlands. From the Indices of deprivation 2007, it can be seen that, in common with Northern England, the region has more Lower Area Super Output Areas in the 20% most deprived districts than in the 20% least deprived districts. The region's most deprived council districts, in descending order, are Birmingham (10th highest in England), Sandwell (14th), Stoke-on-Trent (16th), Wolverhampton (28th), Walsall (45th), Coventry (61st), and Dudley (100th).

The least deprived districts in 2007 (before Shropshire became a unitary authority in 2009) were Bromsgrove, South Staffordshire, Warwick, Wychavon, and Lichfield. At county level, the least deprived areas, in descending order, were Warwickshire, Worcestershire, Solihull, Staffordshire, and Shropshire.

In March 2011 the region had the second highest overall unemployment claimant count in England at 4.7%, second to North East England. The highest in the region was Wolverhampton at 7.7%, the joint second highest (with Manchester) unemployment rate in England. Next is Sandwell with 7.1%, Birmingham with 7.0%, and Walsall with 6.4%. The lowest rate in the region is the district of Stratford-on-Avon, with 1.6% – one of the lowest unemployment rates in England.

=== Place of Birth ===
This table includes place of birth in West Midlands Region for 2021 census

#	Country	Number
1	England	4,914,178
2	India	127,321
3	Pakistan	112,440
4	Poland	72,745
5	Wales	72,158
6	Romania	56,424
7	Scotland	45,250
8	Ireland	30,561
9	Bangladesh	30,451
10	Jamaica	24,569
11	Italy	20,988
12	Nigeria	19,913
13	Germany	18,287
14	Northern Ireland	16,438
15	China	14,640
16	Zimbabwe	13,604
17	Somalia	13,154
18	Ghana	12,175
19	Kenya	11,132
20	South Africa	10,976

== Politics ==
=== Regional assembly ===
The official representative body of the region is the West Midlands Leaders Board which has limited administrative functions such as regional planning and economic development. The board is not an elected body, but is made up of members appointed from local councils across the region and is known as a quango. It is based on Edward Street in Birmingham, near the National Indoor Arena. From March 2010, the funding decisions at regional level were taken over by Advantage West Midlands, the Regional Development Agency.

=== Elections ===
In the 2015 general election, the Conservatives gained the largest share of the region by popular vote and took control of the number of seats, with 42% of the region's electorate voting Conservative, 33% Labour, 16% UKIP, 6% Liberal Democrat and 3% Green. The Conservatives gained 2 seats with virtually no swing from Labour to Conservative.

General Election results in 2017

In the 2017 general election, South Staffordshire (Gavin Williamson) had the second-highest Conservative vote proportion in the UK – 69.8%. David Firth, at the University of Warwick, invented the BBC election exit poll. 6 ft 9 Daniel Kawczynski, a former Shropshire MP, was the tallest MP ever.

As of the 2024 general election, the Labour Party have the most seats in the region with 38 and won 34.0% of the vote. The Conservatives lost 29 and hold 15 seats, almost halving their vote share to 27.6%. The Liberal Democrats gained two and the Green Party gained one, both from zero. There is also an independent MP representing Birmingham Perry Barr.

=== Political parties ===
The Green Party of England and Wales was formed at the Bridge Inn in Napton-on-the-Hill, Warwickshire, in February 1973, originating from an article by Paul R. Ehrlich about population growth in Playboy magazine. In 1975, it became the Ecology Party and then the Green Party in 1985.

=== ITL ===
In the ONS International Territorial Levels (ITL), the West Midlands form a level-1 ITL region, coded "UKG", which is subdivided as follows:

ITL 1	Code	ITL 2	Code	ITL 3	Code
West Midlands	UKG	Herefordshire, Worcestershire and Warwickshire	UKG1	Herefordshire	UKG11
		Herefordshire, Worcestershire and Warwickshire	UKG1	Worcestershire CC	UKG12
		Herefordshire, Worcestershire and Warwickshire	UKG1	Warwickshire CC	UKG13
		Shropshire and Staffordshire	UKG2	Telford and Wrekin	UKG21
		Shropshire and Staffordshire	UKG2	Shropshire	UKG22
		Shropshire and Staffordshire	UKG2	Stoke-on-Trent	UKG23
		Shropshire and Staffordshire	UKG2	Staffordshire CC	UKG24
		West Midlands	UKG3	Birmingham	UKG31
		West Midlands	UKG3	Solihull	UKG32
		West Midlands	UKG3	Coventry	UKG33
		West Midlands	UKG3	Dudley	UKG36
		West Midlands	UKG3	Sandwell	UKG37
		West Midlands	UKG3	Walsall	UKG38
		West Midlands	UKG3	Wolverhampton	UKG39

== Local government ==
The region consists of the following administrative subdivisions:

Map	Ceremonial county	Metropolitan or non-metropolitan county	Districts
	1. Herefordshire (unitary authority area)		
	Shropshire	2. Shropshire (unitary authority area)	
	Shropshire	3. Telford and Wrekin (unitary authority area)	
	Staffordshire	4. Staffordshire †	a) Cannock Chase, b) East Staffordshire, c) Lichfield, d) Newcastle-under-Lyme, e) South Staffordshire, f) Stafford, g) Staffordshire Moorlands, h) Tamworth
	Staffordshire	5. Stoke-on-Trent (unitary authority area)	
	6. Warwickshire †		a) North Warwickshire, b) Nuneaton and Bedworth, c) Rugby, d) Stratford-on-Avon, e) Warwick
	7. West Midlands *		a) Birmingham, b) Coventry, c) Dudley, d) Sandwell, e) Solihull, f) Walsall, g) Wolverhampton
	8. Worcestershire †		a) Bromsgrove, b) Malvern Hills, c) Redditch, d) Worcester, e) Wychavon, f) Wyre Forest

Key: †two-tier non-metropolitan county | *metropolitan county including the West Midlands Combined Authority and mayor

After upcoming local government reorganisation across England, the region in 2028 will then consist of the following unitary authorities:

Ceremonial county	Unitary authorities
Herefordshire	1. Herefordshire
Shropshire	2. Shropshire
Shropshire	3. Telford and Wrekin
Staffordshire	4. North Staffordshire
Staffordshire	5. South and Mid Staffordshire
Warwickshire	6. North Warwickshire
Warwickshire	7. South Warwickshire
8. West Midlands *	a) Birmingham, b) Coventry, c) Dudley, d) Sandwell, e) Solihull, f) Walsall, g) Wolverhampton
Worcestershire	9. North Worcestershire
Worcestershire	10. South Worcestershire

Key: *metropolitan county including the West Midlands Combined Authority and mayor

=== Demography ===
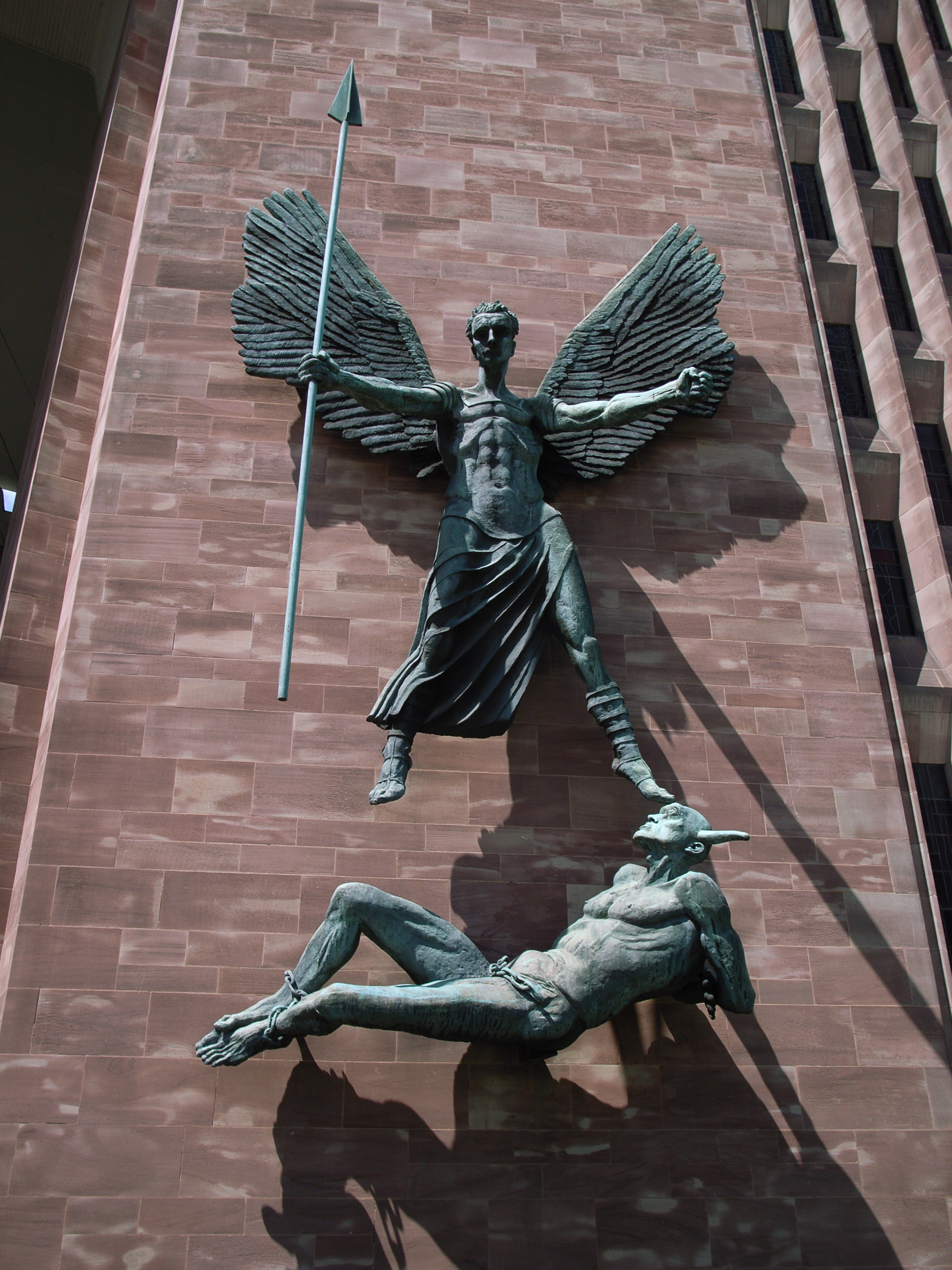
Statue of St Michael and Satan at Coventry Cathedral

Ceremonial County	Population	Population density	Largest local authority	Largest settlement
West Midlands (region)	5,267,337	405/km^{2}	Birmingham (1,006,500)	Birmingham (1,006,500)
West Midlands (county)	2,600,100	2,884/km^{2}	Birmingham (1,006,500)	Birmingham (1,006,500)
Staffordshire	1,062,500	391/km^{2}	Stoke-on-Trent (240,636)	Stoke-on-Trent (259,252)
Worcestershire	552,900	318/km^{2}	Wychavon (116,300)	Worcester (93,400)
Warwickshire	522,200	264/km^{2}	Warwick (132,900)	Nuneaton (70,721)
Shropshire	451,100	129/km^{2}	Shropshire (290,900)	Telford (138,241)
Herefordshire	177,800	82/km^{2}	N/A	Hereford (50,400)

The West Midlands' population accounts for almost 11% of England's overall population. 49.36% of the region's population resides in the West Midlands county, 20.17% in Staffordshire, 10.49% in Worcestershire, 9.91% in Warwickshire, 8.56% in Shropshire, and 3.37% in Herefordshire.

== Economy ==
Business Link West Midlands was based on the Quinton Business Park in Quinton, next to Highways England. NHS West Midlands, the strategic health authority was in Edgbaston. The West Midlands Ambulance Service is in Brierley Hill, near the headquarters of West Midlands Police, where the Child Support Agency (CSA) was headquartered. The region's Manufacturing Advisory Service was on Wolverhampton Science Park, north of the city centre; this function is now represented by Made in the Midlands, north of Wolverhampton.

The DIT West Midlands for the region is based at the West Midlands Chambers of Commerce on Harborne Road, south of NHS West Midlands west of Five Ways. Most of the region is covered by the Midlands Air Ambulance, except Warwickshire is covered by the Warwickshire & Northamptonshire Air Ambulance, based at Coventry Airport; both are charity-funded. Sir Anthony Bamford of Staffordshire is the richest British industrialist, at around £3.15bn in 2014; Sir James Dyson is second (£3bn).

== Education ==
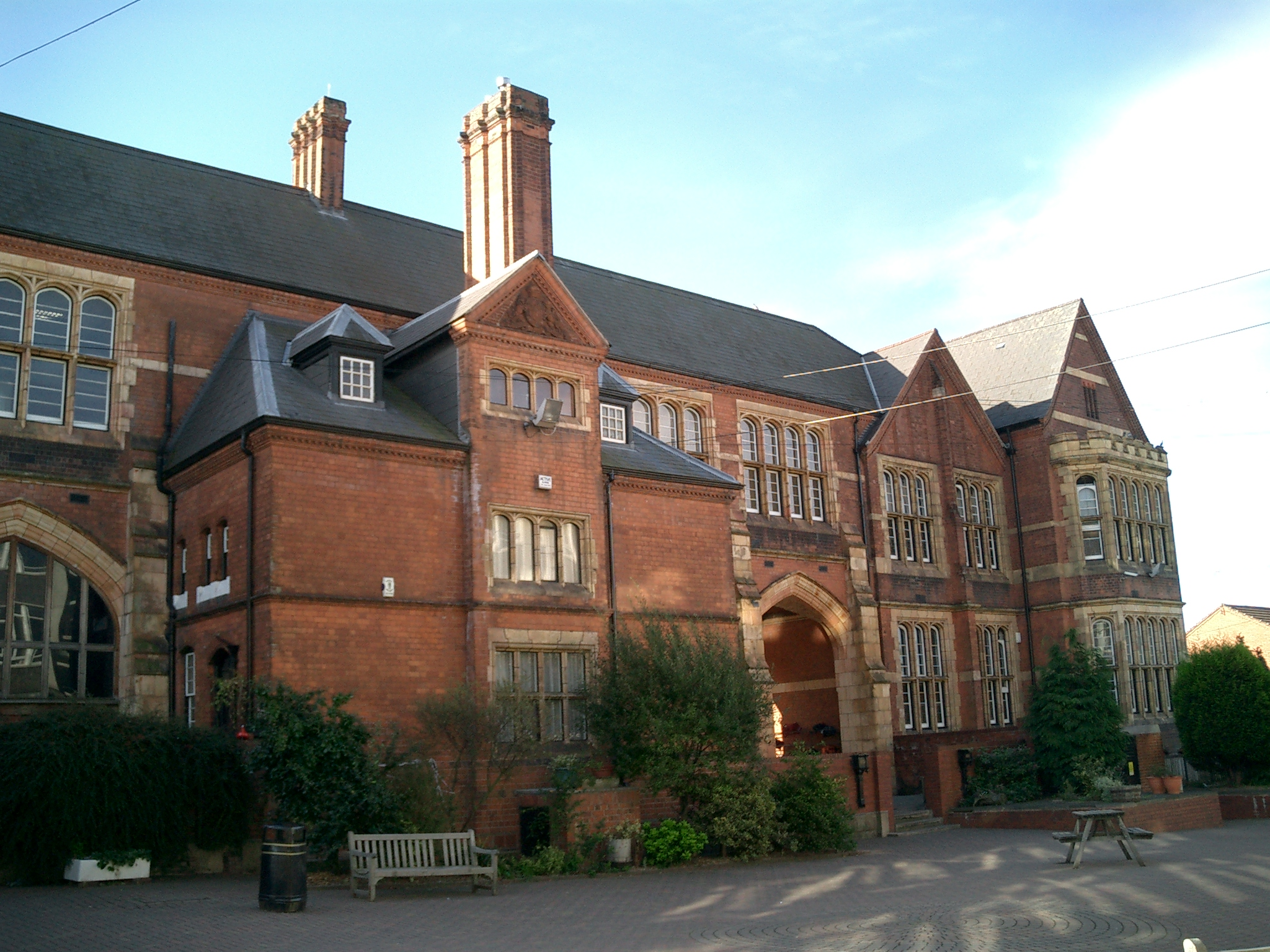
King Edward VI Aston School

=== Secondary education ===
Selective schools are in low numbers as follows: Birmingham (8), Walsall (2), Wolverhampton (1), Warwickshire (6), Stoke-on-Trent (1), and Telford and Wrekin (2). The highest proportion per head therefore is Warwickshire (its population is between 550,000 and 600,000 people). The other counties and metropolitan boroughs have none, their public education systems are comprehensive in intake. The grammar and independent schools tend to produce pass-rate examination results among the top twenty ranked regionally. Many pupils compete for entrance examinations to attend such long-established Grammar Schools and most have significant parent sponsorship. In 2016 two of the top ten such schools nationally were in Warwickshire, where in the CV37 postal district prices were 34% higher than the county as a whole.

Around 275,000 secondary schools are in the region, the greatest number after the South East, Greater London and North West.

At GCSE based on % of entrants' pass rates, the best performing local government area in 2010 was Solihull, closely followed by Warwickshire and Shropshire. Dudley, Herefordshire, Telford and Wrekin, Birmingham and Staffordshire (in descending order) are above the English average, at which rate, is approximately Worcestershire. The area consistently having fewest passes is Sandwell, followed by Stoke-on-Trent. Struggling pupils in Wolverhampton and Walsall also attain fewer passes than the English average in most GCSE years, sometimes by a very narrow margin. For metropolitan boroughs, Solihull then Dudley perform best. Dudley is the best metropolitan borough at A-level passes and has a consistent post-2000 history of being better than Solihull.

According to The Guardian, schools have been off-rolling pupils. Pupils likely to perform poorly in examinations are expelled before the examinations to improve the school performance in league tables. Expelled pupils then disproportionately get involved in gangs and in crime. Knife crime in the West Midlands is the highest outside London.

In 2010, regionally in persistent truancy at secondary school, Sandwell had the highest rate at 6.9%; Bromsgrove had the lowest at 2.3%.

=== Tertiary education ===
There are thirty-seven FE colleges (FECs). There are six LSCs for the area (which fund FECs), and the Learning and Skills Council head office is based in Coventry. The five largest FE colleges in the region – Bournville College, North Warwickshire and Hinckley College, Solihull College, South & City College Birmingham and Stoke-on-Trent College – each have more than 25,000 students.

School children in Shropshire and Solihull are most likely to attend university, followed by Herefordshire, Worcestershire and Warwickshire.

=== School league tables ===
Below is a list of the top twenty state schools in the West Midlands by 2010 A level results:

1. King Edward VI Camp Hill School for Girls, Kings Heath (1212)
2. Sutton Coldfield Grammar School for Girls
3. King Edward VI Five Ways, Bartley Green
4. King Edward VI Camp Hill School for Boys, Kings Heath
5. Stratford-upon-Avon Grammar School for Girls
6. Queen Mary's Grammar School, Walsall
7. King Edward VI College, Stourbridge
8. Newport Girls High School
9. King Edward VI Handsworth
10. King Edward VI School, Stratford-upon-Avon
11. King Edward VI Aston
12. Bishop Vesey's Grammar School, Sutton Coldfield
13. Wolverhampton Girls' High School
14. Thomas Telford School, Telford
15. St. Joseph's College, Stoke-on-Trent
16. Queen Mary's High School, Walsall
17. Rugby High School for Girls
18. St Augustine's High School, Redditch
19. Hereford Sixth Form College
20. Moorlands Sixth Form College, Cheadle, Staffordshire

=== Universities ===
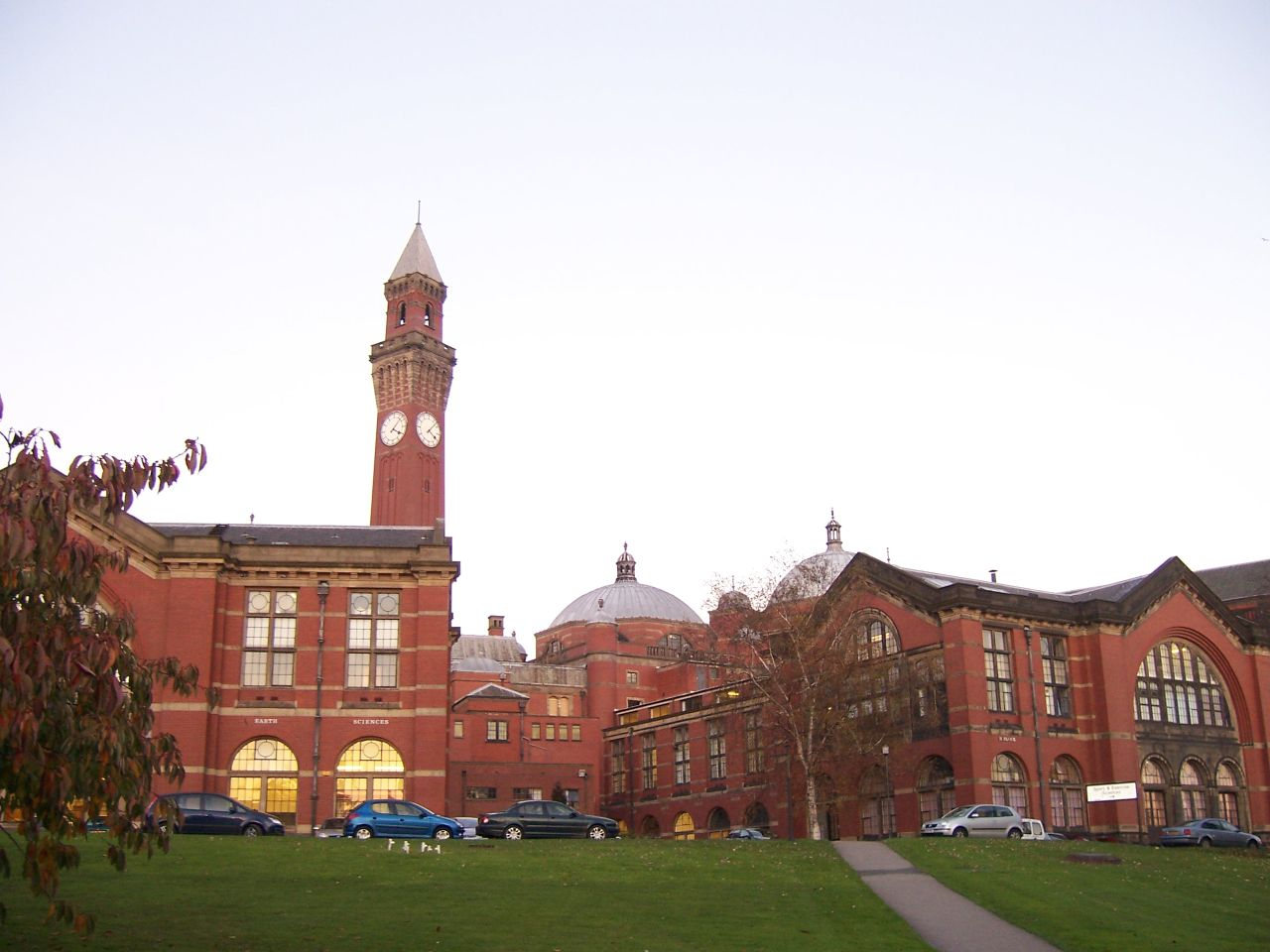
University of Birmingham

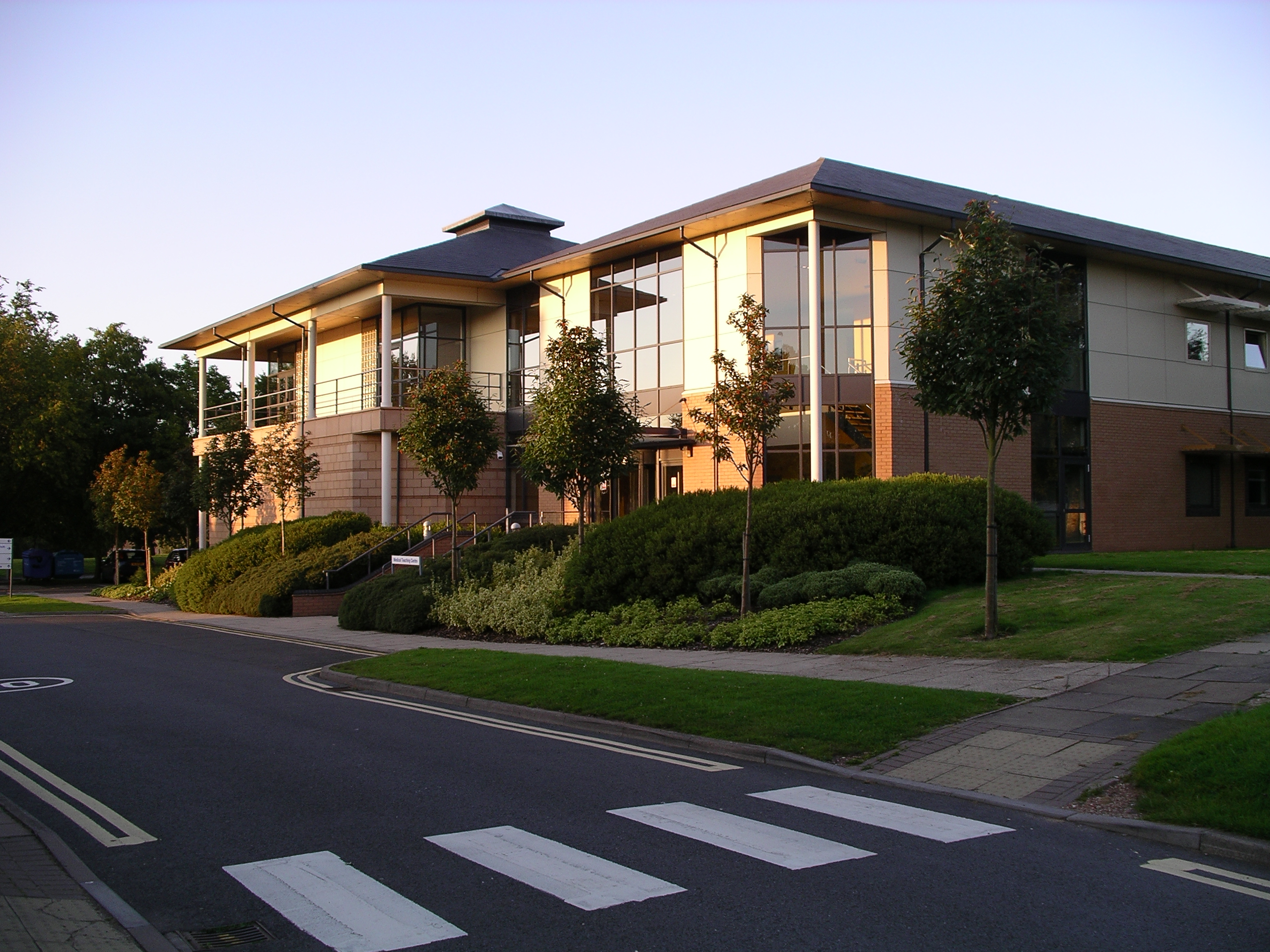
University of Warwick – Medical Teaching Centre

University	Students	National ranking (2017)
University of Birmingham	34,835	13
Coventry University	31,690	54
University of Warwick	25,615	11
Birmingham City University	24,130	84
University of Wolverhampton	19,560	121
Stafford University	14,910	75
Aston University	14,162	43
University of Worcester	10,745	97
Keele University	10,600	104
Harper Adams University	5,410	41
University College Birmingham	4,935	–
Newman University	2,830	120

The University of Birmingham is the main university in the region and has the most funding. It has a large research grant, as does the University of Warwick, which is the next largest in terms of funding. Birmingham and Warwick are members of the Russell Group of public research universities. Keele and Aston have a moderate research grant, but none of the other universities do. Keele, although having the largest campus in the UK (by area), is one of the smallest universities in the region. There are medical schools at Warwick, Keele and Birmingham. Birmingham and Warwick receive more than twice as much total income than any other university in the region – around £400 million each.

Around 45% of students are from the region, and 35% from other parts of the UK, while 20% are from overseas. The region attracts students from South East England owing to good access via the M40 and the West Coast Main Line, but there is a good mix from other regions too, except the North East (especially) and Yorkshire. Students native to the West Midlands are most likely to study in the region (40%), then the East Midlands (12%), the North West (11%), and then Yorkshire (9%). Very few go to the East of England or the North East. The region has a net export of university students to other regions.

At time of graduation in 2010 almost 60% of graduates remained in the West Midlands, with 10% going to London, 7% to the South-East, and around 5% to the East Midlands. Very few go to Yorkshire, the North-East, or even (neighbouring) Wales.

== Transport ==
=== Railways ===
Served by many lines in the urban areas such as the West Coast Main Line and branches. The Welsh Marches Line and the Cotswold Line transect the region as well as the Cross Country Route and Chiltern Line. There are plans to reopen the Gloucestershire Warwickshire Railway. The HS2 (High Speed Two) project is planned to connect London to Birmingham. The opening date is uncertain, but beyond 2033.

=== Roads ===
Several notable roads pass through the region, with most converging around the central conurbation. The M5 motorway, which connects South West England to the region, passes through Worcestershire and Gloucestershire, and through the West Midlands county, past West Bromwich, with its northern terminus at its junction with the M6 outside Staffordshire. The M6, which has its southern terminus just outside the southeast of the region at its junction with the M1 motorway, and which connects the region to North West England, passes Rugby and Nuneaton in Warwickshire, Coventry and Birmingham, and Stafford and Stoke-on-Trent in Staffordshire. The M6 toll provides an alternative route to the M6 between Coleshill and Cannock, passing north of Sutton Coldfield and just south of Lichfield.

The M45 motorway connects the region through Warwickshire to the East Midlands, giving access to the north of the M1 motorway and, with its eastern terminus at its junction with the A45 road near the Warwickshire-Northamptonshire border; it passes close to Rugby and Dunchurch. The M42 connects the M5 at Bromsgrove, passing around the south and east of Birmingham, joining the M40 and M6, passing Fordbridge, Kingshurst and Castle Bromwich, to Tamworth, northeast of Birmingham. The M50 connects the M5 from near Tewkesbury to Ross-on-Wye in the southwest. The M54 connects Wellington in the west, passing Telford, to the M6 near Cannock. The A5 road traverses the region northwest–southeast, passing through Shrewsbury, Telford, Cannock, Tamworth and Nuneaton, also giving access to Hinckley.

The A40, the longest A- road in Zone 4, passes through Ross-on-Wye alongside the A449, which goes to Stafford and Newport, and M50 motorway.

The longest elevated road viaduct in the UK is the 3 miles (4,779 m) section from Gravelly Hill to Castle Bromwich on the M6, opened on 24 May 1972; the 3.5 miles (5.6 km) Bromford Viaduct is the longest viaduct in the UK. The section of the A45 in Coventry from Willenhall to Allesley in 1939 was one of the UK's first ever large planned road schemes; road schemes on that scale had not been previously built, with few large road schemes outside of London, or were piecemeal.

Princes Square in Wolverhampton had Britain's first automatic traffic lights on 5 November 1927. On 13 January 2012, 34-year-old Ben Westwood of Wednesfield, was caught by the police, when speeding at 180 mph, in an Audi RS5 with a Lamborghini engine, from Wolverhampton up to Stafford on the M6, and back again. He was travelling so fast that he was outpacing the Central Counties Air Operations Unit Eurocopter helicopter. He and the vehicle had been in fifteen smash and grab raids and he was jailed for nine years at Wolverhampton Crown Court in August 2012.

=== Transport policy ===
As part of the transport planning system, the Regional Assembly is under statutory requirement to produce a regional transport strategy (RTS) to provide long term planning for transport in the region. This involves region-wide transport schemes such as those carried out by Highways England and Network Rail.

Within the region, the local transport authorities carry out transport planning through the use of a local transport plan (LTP) which outlines their strategies, policies and implementation programme. The most recent LTP is that for the period 2006–11. In the West Midlands region, the following transport authorities have published their LTP online: Herefordshire, Shropshire U.A., Staffordshire, Telford and Wrekin U.A., Warwickshire, West Midlands and Worcestershire. The transport authority of Stoke-on-Trent U.A. publishes a joint local transport plan in partnership with Staffordshire County Council to cover the North Staffordshire Major Urban Area, which includes Stoke-on-Trent and the more urban parts of Newcastle-under-Lyme and Staffordshire Moorlands.

== Media ==
=== Television ===
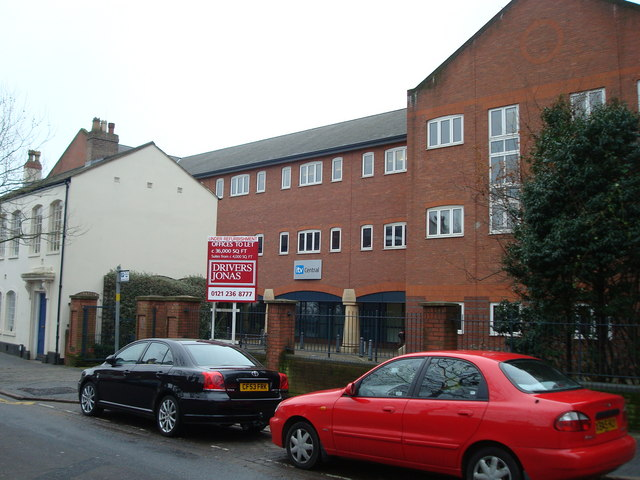
ITV Central Gas Street Studios in Birmingham

The West Midlands region of the BBC is based at the Mailbox in Birmingham. From there, the regional programme Midlands Today is produced, as well as the BBC'S flagship daytime series Doctors. ITV Central broadcasts from Birmingham, off Broad Street on Gas Street next to the Worcester and Birmingham Canal, with its ITV News Central regional programme.

Some northern parts of the region, including Biddulph, receive BBC North West Tonight and Granada Reports both of which are based at MediaCityUK in Salford and are broadcast from the Winter Hill transmitter.

The BBC has its engineering training centre at Wood Norton, Worcestershire, off the A44 north of Evesham in Norton and Lenchwick. BBC English Regions is based at Birmingham.

=== Radio ===
==== BBC Local ====
The West Midlands is served by numerous BBC Local Radio stations, including BBC Radio WM, BBC CWR, BBC Radio Stoke, BBC Hereford & Worcester, BBC Radio Shropshire and BBC Radio Derby (covering East Staffordshire).

==== Commercial ====
Commercial radio stations include Hits Radio, Capital Midlands, Capital Mid-Counties, Heart West Midlands, Smooth West Midlands, Absolute Radio, Greatest Hits Radio, Sunshine 855 and Sunshine Radio Herefordshire & Monmouthshire.

==== Community ====
Community radio stations include:

- Black Country Radio (Dudley and Stourbridge)
- Radio Wyvern (Worcester)
- BRMB (Birmingham)
- Radio Plus and Hillz FM in (Coventry)
- WCR FM and Gorgeous Radio (Wolverhampton)
- Moorlands Radio (Leek)
- 6 Towns Radio and Cross Rhythms City Radio (Stoke-on-Trent)
- The Hitmix (Newcastle-under-Lyme)
- Cannock Chase Radio and Stafford FM (Stafford)

Stafford is also notable for Windmill Broadcasting, the UK's only radio station based in a windmill, in the Broad Eye Windmill.

=== Newspapers ===
Local newspapers include:

- Berrow's Worcester Journal
- Birmingham Mail
- Birmingham Post
- Burton Mail
- Coventry Telegraph
- Express & Star (Wolverhampton)
- Nuneaton News
- Shropshire Star
- The Sentinel (Stoke-on-Trent)
- The Shuttle (Kidderminster based, reporting on Wyre Forest news, Worcestershire)
- Worcester News

=== Magazines ===
William Gibbons of Wolverhampton prints New Scientist, The Lady, Farmers Weekly, BBC Focus, Psychologies, History Revealed, Classic Rock, and Tractors & Machinery.

The Polestar Varnicoat works on the A44 in Pinvin, north of Pershore, for many years printed Woman's Own, Heat, Pick Me Up, Chat, and That's Life.

=== Online ===
Channel 4's 4Talent network has a hub in the West Midlands dealing with rising media talent from the region.

== Sport ==
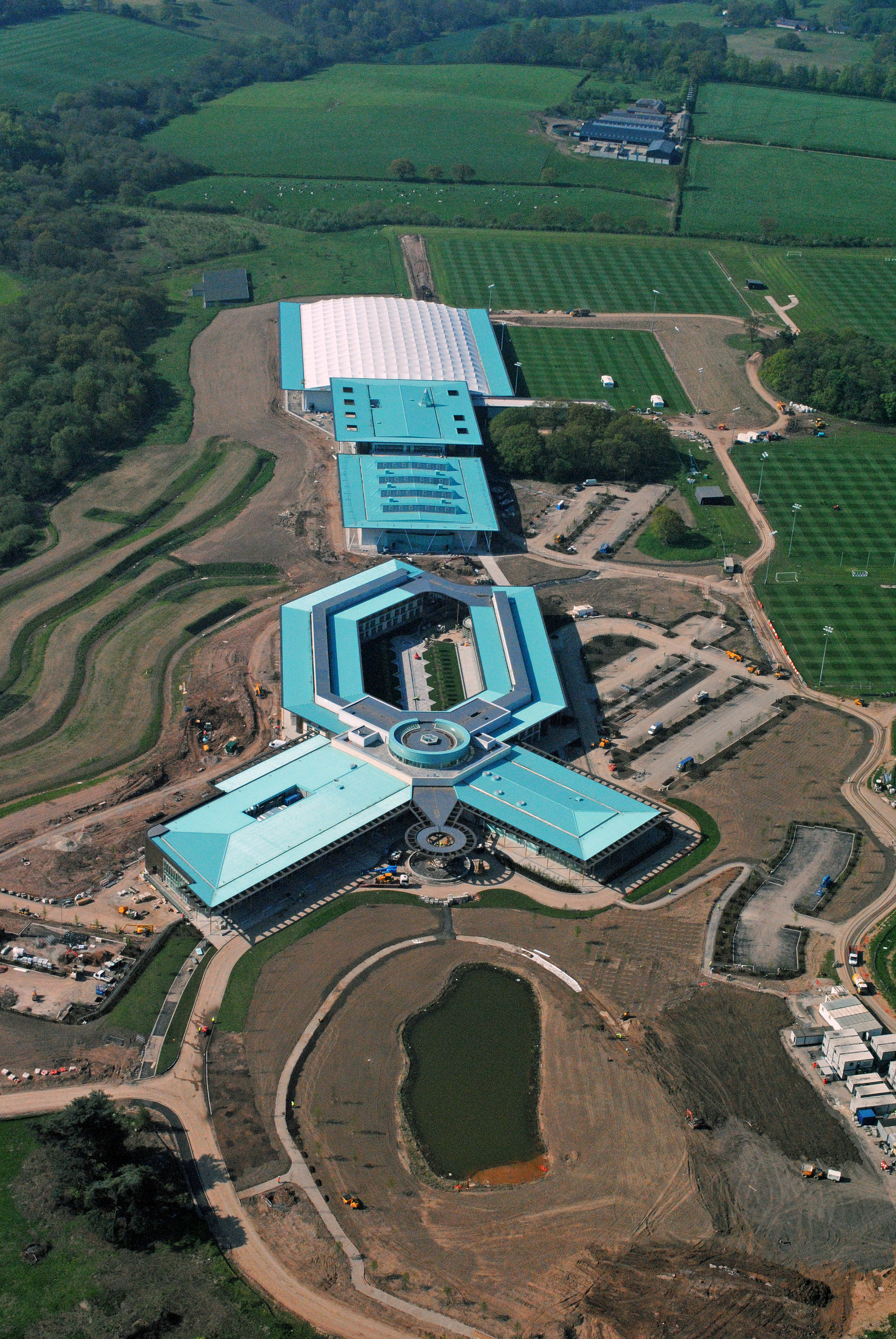
St George's Park is the training ground of the England national football team.

The National Sports Centre at Lilleshall Hall is in Sheriffhales, Shropshire, north-east of Telford; it was largely established by the Central Council of Physical Recreation in 1949 as a National Recreation Centre; the south of England had theirs at Bisham Abbey on the Thames. St George's Park National Football Centre is at Tatenhill near Byrkley Park in Needwood Forest, near former the RAF Tatenhill off the A515, four miles west of Burton upon Trent.

The Tough Guy Competition, now a widespread sport competition in the US, began in 1987 on a farm at Perton in Staffordshire. The main British athletics championships are held in Birmingham in late June. The Olympic Movement started at Much Wenlock, and also to the east of region, where Baron de Coubertin formulated his ideas for sport and the Olympics at Rugby School in 1883, with the headmaster Thomas Arnold, whose son would be the famous poet Matthew Arnold and whose great-grandson would be Aldous Huxley.

=== Football ===
Club	League	City/Town	Stadium	Capacity
Aston Villa	Premier League	Birmingham	Villa Park	42,788
Wolverhampton Wanderers	Premier League	Wolverhampton	Molineux Stadium	31,700
Birmingham City	EFL Championship	Birmingham	St Andrew's	30,079
Stoke City	EFL Championship	Stoke-on-Trent	Bet365 Stadium	30,089
West Bromwich Albion	EFL Championship	West Bromwich	The Hawthorns	26,500
Burton Albion	League One	Burton-upon-Trent	Pirelli Stadium	6,912
Coventry City	EFL Championship	Coventry	Coventry Building Society Arena	32,609
Shrewsbury Town	League One	Shrewsbury	New Meadow	9,875
Walsall	League Two	Walsall	Bescot Stadium	11,300
Port Vale	League One	Stoke-on-Trent	Vale Park	19,052
Solihull Moors	National League	Solihull	The ARMCO Stadium	3,050
A.F.C. Telford United	Southern League Premier Division Central	Telford	New Bucks Head	6,300
Hereford	National League North	Hereford	Edgar Street	4,913
Kidderminster Harriers	National League North	Kidderminster	Aggborough	6,250
Nuneaton Borough	Southern League Premier Division Central	Nuneaton	Liberty Way	4,314
Leamington	National League North	Leamington Spa	New Windmill Ground	5,000
Sutton Coldfield Town	Northern Premier League Midlands	Sutton Coldfield	Central Ground	2,000

=== Rugby ===
In rugby union, the region is home to professional Premiership teams Wasps RFC and Worcester Warriors. In rugby league, Midlands Hurricanes play in the third tier League 1.

=== Tennis ===
Britain's first tennis club was founded in 1872 in Leamington Spa. The modern rules of lawn tennis were developed in 1874 by Leamington Tennis Club. Tennis was pioneered in Edgbaston in 1859, and Edgbaston Archery and Lawn Tennis Society also claims to be the oldest tennis club in the world, where tennis was invented by Major Harry Gem and the Spaniard Augurio Perera.

=== Motor sport ===
Team Dynamics at Pershore has won the British Touring Car Championship.
