= John Stuart Mackenzie =

British philosopher (1860-1935)

John Stuart Mackenzie (29 February 1860, Springburn, Glasgow – 6 December 1935, Brockweir) was a British idealist philosopher, born near Glasgow, and educated at Glasgow, Cambridge, and Berlin. In 1884-89 he was a fellow at Edinburgh and from 1890 to 1896 fellow of Trinity College, Cambridge. He lectured on political economy at Owens College, Manchester, in 1890-93, and in 1895 became professor of logic and philosophy in University College, Cardiff. Mackenzie was an idealist philosopher and a Hegelian of the type of Green, Bradley, Bosanquet, and Caird.

Mackenzie was not religious and was subscribed to a humanist ethical belief system. He was a member of the Union of Ethical Societies (today's Humanists UK) since its founding meeting in 1896. He became the organisation's first official President in 1918.

== Biography ==
John Stuart MacKenzie was born the second son of John Mackenzie and Janet Brown on 29 February 1860 at Springburn, near Hogganfield, Glasgow. When he was eight years old, his father decided to take the family to seek their fortune in Buenos Aires. Soon after their arrival, having spent seven weeks at sea, Mrs Mackenzie died of cholera, and Mr. Mackenzie some weeks later. The two boys were sent back to Tollcross to be cared for by an aunt, attended the local school, and then Annfield House Academy, Glasgow. Mackenzie's elder brother went into engineering, while John entered the High School of Glasgow.

He became interested in Descartes, Darwin, Huxley, John Tyndall and Herbert Spencer and thus went on to study Philosophy at Glasgow University in 1877, studying under and befriending Edward Caird and Caird's assistant Henry Jones. Having become particularly interested in German philosophy, he undertook further studies in Berlin. On completing his degree, Mackenzie won the Clarke fellowship and succeeded Jones as Caird's assistant. In 1886, encouraged by his friend W.R. Sorley, he began to study in Cambridge, where he became a close friend of J. M. E. McTaggart who introduced him to the philosophy of Hegel.

For the Shaw fellowship course of lectures he held at Edinburgh, he chose the subject of Socialism, having witnessed the poverty and depravation of the slums of Glasgow. The Shaw lectures were published as An Introduction to Social Philosophy in 1890. The book anticipated much of the social legislation that was to follow; the growth of adult education, unemployment insurance, and economic planning with respect to investments and labour. In 1889 he graduated from Cambridge with first class honours and became a fellow of Trinity College, Cambridge, and then an assistant to Professor Adamson at Manchester. In 1895 he became professor of logic and philosophy at Cardiff. His appointment is recorded in the Minutes of the University College of South Wales and Monmouthshire, 1890-95 in a Special Meeting of Council, held on 19 December 1894, resolving that "Mr John Stuart MacKenzie MA Fellow of Trinity College, Cambridge be appointed Professor of Logic + Philosophy at a stipend of £350 per annum, the appointment to date from Christmas 1894." Here he met his future wife, the head of women's teacher training, Hettie Millicent Hughes from Bristol, author of the book Hegel's Educational Theory and Practice, and erstwhile Labour Candidate in 1918 for the University of Wales. In 1911 he received the honorary degree of LL.D. from Glasgow and was elected a Fellow of the British Academy in 1934.

He retired in 1915 at the age of fifty-five in order to devote himself to writing and travel and both he and his wife travelled extensively after the end of the War. They toured India in 1920 and 1922 to lecture and took up contact with George Arundale in Adyar and Bertram Keightley in Benares, both leading theosophists. On their return to England, Millicent’s friend Edith Maryon, invited them to take part in the Summer Art Course in Dornach, Switzerland, where they were deeply impressed by Rudolf Steiner, with Anthroposophy and his work in education. Rudolf Steiner was very appreciative of the work both of them had done, particularly on the philosophy of Hegel. On their return to the UK once again, John Mackenzie continued to lecture and engage himself on behalf of the educational work of Rudolf Steiner that was being established in Britain.

After living in Cambridge, London and Bristol, the Mackenzies returned to their country home at Brockweir. He died on 6 December 1935, and was cremated in Bristol. His memoires were published posthumously by his wife with a biographical sketch by W. Tudor Jones. The Mackenzie Hall, town hall of Brockweir, is named after him.

"Mackenzie's work stands as an important example of British idealist philosophy. He put forward no fundamentally new theses, but he demonstrated the extent to which the position could accommodate itself to new ideas, raising question as to why it ultimately fell out of favour. His style was not for precise or rigid argument, and he is always both tentative and modest. Suggesting that ‘in philosophy, every dogma is a heresy’, he argued that:

"…what I am inclined to claim for philosophy is not that it provides us with any ready made doctrines … but that it enables us to take a general survey of the totality of our experience, and to see clearly … that we have some right to hope and a still more manifest duty to strive. (Elements of Constructive Philosophy, p. 478)"
(Quoted from The Continuum Encyclopedia of British Philosophy)

Also the following citation has found its way in many books of latter authors.

"(...) the distinction between what is real and what is imaginary is not one that can be finally maintained. (…). (…) all existing things are (...) imaginary." pp. 440 in "Elements of Constructive Philosophy"

== Principal works ==
- An Introduction to Social Philosophy: The Shaw Fellowship Lectures at Glasgow (1890; second edition, Glasgow, Maclehose, 1895)
- A Manual of Ethics (1893; seventh edition, 1910) ASIN B00865JUEI
- Outlines of Metaphysics (1902, second edition, 1906)
- Lectures on Humanism (1907)
- Elements of Constructive Philosophy (1917) reprinted BiblioBazaar (24 September 2009) ISBN 978-1113699442
- Outlines of Social Philosophy (London, Allen and Unwin, 1918) ASIN B005HIQRKW
- Outlines of Social Psychology University of California Libraries (1 January 1918) ASIN B006CZ4V8O
- Fundamental Problems of Life (1928)

== Biographical ==
J. W. Scott, 'Mackenzie, John Stuart (1860-1935)' Dictionary of national Biography 1931-41;

J. H. Muirhead, 'John Stuart Mackenzie', Proceedings of the British Academy, 21 (1935);

J. H. Muirhead, 'J. S. Mackenzie' (1860-1935)', Mind, ns., 45 (1936)

John Stuart Mackenzie. [An autobiography.] Edited by his wife, etc. With a chapter on the life and work of J. S. Mackenzie by W. Tudor Jones. Williams & Norgate, 1936
