= Jessica Boland =

British materials scientist

Jessica Louise Boland is a British materials scientist, a reader of materials engineering in the Photon Science Institute of the University of Manchester, and a lead scientist for the Henry Royce Institute in the "Atoms to Devices" research area. Her research concerns terahertz spectroscopy and semiconductor nanowires, connected both through the use of nanowires as part of terahertz spectroscopy equipment and the use of terahertz spectroscopy to characterize the behavior of nanowires.

== Education and career ==
After attending Queen Mary's High School in Walsall, Boland was an undergraduate at the University of Exeter. She received a master's degree there in 2013 after research in microwave plasmonics at HP Labs in Bristol. She completed a doctorate in 2017 at the University of Oxford under the supervision of Michael Johnston.

Next, she became a postdoctoral scholar as a Humboldt Fellow at the University of Regensburg. She joined the academic staff of the University of Manchester, as a lecturer in its Department of Electrical and Electronic Engineering, in 2018. In 2023 she moved to the university's Department of Materials.

== Recognition ==
Boland was the recipient of the 2017 Jocelyn Bell Burnell Medal of the Institute of Physics, an annual award to an outstanding young female physicist. She was honored "for having developed novel techniques for characterising the charge carrier dynamics of semiconductor nanowires, enabling demonstration of single nanowire terahertz detectors and ultrafast optically switchable nanowire-based terahertz modulators for ultrafast wireless communication". She also received the 2022 IRMMW-THz Society Zhenyi Wang Award, given annually to outstanding female researchers in infrared, millimeter, and terahertz wave science, technology and applications. The award recognized Boland's "achievements in THz frequency characterization of advanced functional nanomaterials and their applications in THz devices".

She was the 2019 Isambard Kingdom Brunel Award Lecturer at the British Science Festival of the British Science Association, and a 2019 recipient of the Philip Leverhulme Prizes.

== Personal life ==
Boland was hard of hearing from infancy, and learned to get by through lip reading until receiving her first hearing aids as a teenager. She learned British Sign Language only after becoming a lecturer at Manchester, became an enthusiastic advocate for using it in science communication and science outreach, and has helped develop new signs for new technologies.
