= West Midlands Chambers of Commerce =

West Midlands Chambers of Commerce LLP
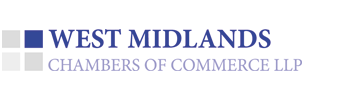
- Abbreviation: WMCC
- Legal status: Limited Liability Partnership
- Purpose: A joint venture partnership of the 6 Chambers of commerce in the West Midlands region
- Location: 75 Harborne Road, Edgbaston, Birmingham, B15 3DH
- Region served: West Midlands
- Members: more than 9,000 companies
- Managing Director: Allen Matty MBE
- Website: www.wmchambers.co.uk

West Midlands Chambers of Commerce (WMCC) NOW NO LONGER TRADING was a collaborative partnership of the 6 Chambers of Commerce in the West Midlands region of the United Kingdom. It brings together the regions Chambers of Commerce, which between them have over 9,000 companies as registered members.

== Organisation ==
The head office of the WMCC was located in Birmingham, at the same address as the Greater Birmingham Chamber of Commerce. It operated through delivery teams based at the offices of its member chambers, giving it a total of six offices. As well as Birmingham these are located in Worcester, Stoke-on-Trent, Wolverhampton, Coventry and Telford.

WMCC closed shortly after the Department for International trade (Now Department of Business and trade) stopped out sourcing their external delivery contracts and brought the services in house in July 2022

== Membership ==
The West Midlands Chambers of Commerce LLP was consisted of six member chambers, each of which is an accredited member of the British Chambers of Commerce. The members are:

- Greater Birmingham Chambers of Commerce Group
- Black Country Chamber of Commerce
- Coventry and Warwickshire Chamber of Commerce
- Herefordshire and Worcestershire Chamber of Commerce
- Staffordshire Chambers of Commerce
- Shropshire Chamber of Commerce

Between them these chambers have a total membership of over 9,000 businesses.

== Activities ==
The WMCC described its core mission as "the delivery of specialist business services across the West Midlands" . A priority was developing international trade and investment in the West Midlands area.

The WMCC previously acted as a single point of contact for government agencies (The Department for International Trade) or other private sector entities who wish to place contracts for the delivery of business support services across the West Midlands region: it can act as both contractor and contract manager.

Its closing Managing Director was Allen Matty MBE reporting to chair of the Board Louise Bennett OBE
