= Barbara Foxley =

English educationist and campaigner for women's rights

- Born: 20 August 1860; Market Weighton, England, United Kingdom of Great Britain and Ireland
- Died: 26 August 1958 (aged 98); Llandrindod Wells, Wales, United Kingdom
- Education: Newnham College
- Employer: University College, Cardiff
- Known for: Educationist and campaigner for women
- Political party: Liberal Party

Barbara Foxley (20 August 1860 – 26 August 1958) was a British Professor of Education at University College, Cardiff and a campaigner for women's rights.

== Life ==
Foxley was born in Market Weighton where her father, Reverend Joseph Foxley, was the vicar. Her mother was Lucy then Allen and Barbara was educated at home before attending schools in London and Manchester. She obtained what would have been a second class degree at Newnham College, but Cambridge University only gave degrees to men until 1949. Her historical tripos and a teaching qualification enabled her to gain a master's degree from Trinity College, Dublin who did not discriminate against women.

Foxley taught in South Wales and obtained a headship at a church school before taking on the leadership of Walsall's Queen Mary's High School. Her success here led to her gaining a position teaching education at the University of Manchester as the "mistress of method". In 1911 she joined University College, Cardiff and her translation of Emile was published by the Everyman's Library. In 1915, she was promoted to Professor of Education succeeding Millicent Mackenzie. She retired in 1925.

Foxley was an active suffragist joining the Cardiff and District Women's Suffrage Society. By 1913, that society was the largest group outside London which was affiliated to the National Union of Women's Suffrage Societies. Foxley was on the executive committee and she worked under Mary Collin who was styled the ‘chairman of executive’. In 1918 some British women were allowed to vote and Foxley joined the national executive committee of the newly renamed National Union of Societies for Equal Citizenship.

Foxley died in a nursing home in Llandrindod Wells in 1958, where she had moved at the end of her retirement.

== Works ==
- Emile, 1911
