= Millicent Mackenzie =

British educator

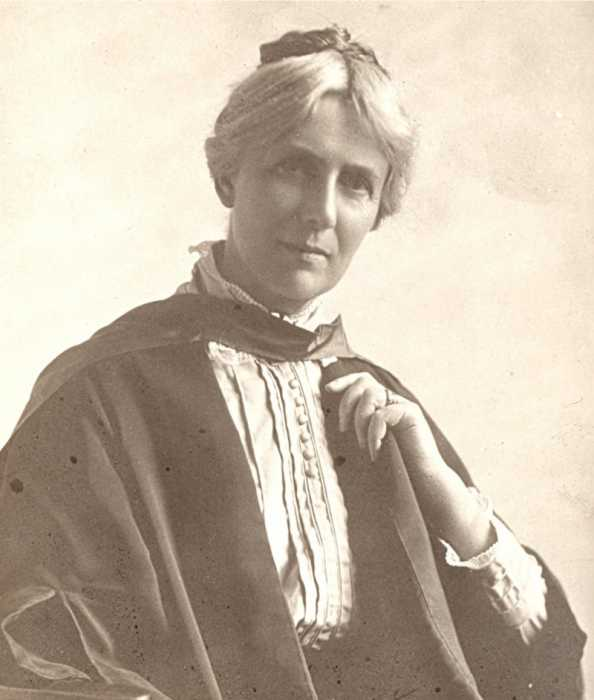
- Mackenzie in 1915
- Born: Hester Millicent Hughes; 1863; Bristol, England
- Died: 10 December 1942 (aged 78–79); Brockweir, England
- Resting place: Arnos Vale Cemetery
- Known for: Being the first woman professor at a fully chartered UK university
- Political party: Labour Party
- Movement: Suffragette
- Spouse: John Stuart Mackenzie (m. 1898; died 1935)

Academic background
- Education: University College, Bristol

Academic work
- Discipline: Education studies
- Sub-discipline: Teacher education, Philosophy of education
- School or tradition: Hegelianism
- Institutions: University College of South Wales and Monmouthshire

Millicent Hughes Mackenzie (1863 in Bristol – 10 December 1942 in Brockweir) was a British professor of education at University College of South Wales and Monmouthshire, the first female professor in Wales and the first appointed to a fully chartered university in the United Kingdom. She wrote on the philosophy of education, founded the Cardiff Suffragist branch, became the only woman candidate in Wales in the 1918 general election, and was a key initiator of Steiner-Waldorf education in the United Kingdom.

== Early life and education ==
Hester Millicent Hughes was born in 1863 into the family of Walter William Hughes of Bristol. She attended school in the Bristol suburb of Clifton and later was sent for further schooling to Switzerland, after which she attended University College, Bristol and the Cambridge Teacher Training College.

== Career ==
She was normal mistress at the University College of South Wales & Monmouthshire from 1891 to 1904. This is where she met John Stuart Mackenzie, professor of philosophy at the University College, a Hegelian and author of philosophical works and text books. The couple married in 1898, and at her request the university allowed her to continue as normal mistress thereafter. When the University College of South Wales and Monmouthshire in Cardiff opened their teacher training for female students, she was appointed to head it, the university being then just a few years old and having a welcoming and enlightened policy towards female students and staff. She made history through her appointment to associate professor in 1904 and to professor of education (women) in 1910, making her the first female professor in Wales and the first female professor appointed to a fully chartered university in the United Kingdom. Mackenzie was appointed a member of the Senate in 1909; she was the first woman appointed to the College's Senate, though the Senate minutes record her as having attended and been active in Senate meetings since 25 October 1904.

She played a key role in the establishment of the College School. This was a demonstration school founded by the university in which members of the Secondary Training Department for Women taught boys until the age of 10, when they went on to public school, and girls until they were 18 or 19.

In 1909, she published Hegel's Educational Theory and Practice, her most important book. She also published many other books and lectures on education.

"Much of her work focused on the methods for preparing teachers for working in schools across the country and advocated co-educational instruction. She researched Welsh and UK schools and also drew insight from the US and European education systems. In 1894, with co-author Amy Blanche Bramwell, they wrote the title Training of Teachers in the United States, a title that focused on the co-education in US teacher trainer schools. She also authored Moral Education: The Task of the Teacher (1909); Freedom in Education. An Inquiry into its Meaning, Value, and Condition (1905)”

== Meeting with Rudolf Steiner's education ==
In 1913, she became a member of the Theosophical Society and on 2 July 1914 joined the London branch of Harry Collison, which was devoted to studying the works of Rudolf Steiner, who had appointed Collison as his official translator into English.

In 1915, Barbara Foxley took over her role as Professor of Education as Mackenzie and her husband went into early retirement to travel and write. The Council Minutes, 1914–1915 record a meeting of the Council on 14 May 1915, accepting their resignations "with deep regret". It was not until after World War I, when travel had become possible again that she went, together with her husband, on two lecture tours, visiting India, Burma, Ceylon and Europe between 1920 and 1922, and Berkeley, California in 1923. In August 1921 the couple were present at the Goetheanum in Dornach, Switzerland to take part in the Summer Art Course that had been organised by Baron Arild Rosenkrantz for English participants. Here they met Rudolf Steiner for the first time, spoke to the people working at the Goetheanum and experienced the educational work being done at the first Waldorf school. Rudolf Steiner spoke highly of them and of the philosophical works they had written, in particular Hegel's Educational Theory and Practice and Jack Mackenzie's Elements of Constructive Philosophy.

As a result of this conference, Mellicent arranged for a lecture cycle for British teachers to take place at Christmas 1921 by Rudolf Steiner and some of the Waldorf teachers. Around forty people responded to her invitation, travelling from England to Dornach, where Rudolf Steiner held the lecture cycle Soul Economy – Body, Soul and Spirit in Waldorf Education besides a varied supporting programme.

On her return to Britain, Millicent then initiated the educational conference in Stratford-on-Avon in April 1922, was the founder and chairperson of the "Educational Union" whose purpose was to bring awareness of Rudolf Steiner's educational ideas into English and American teacher's organisations and directed the organisational group for the summer conference "Spiritual Values in Education and Social Life" in August 1922 in Oxford. She organised the public lecture of Rudolf Steiner on education on 30 August 1924 in Essex Hall, London under the auspices of the Educational Union for the Realisation of Spiritual Values and gave the welcoming address. Through her efforts the founders of Steiner-Waldorf education in the United Kingdom were introduced to these ideas and built up the first schools.

== Political career ==
Mackenzie joined the women's movement, co-founding the Cardiff and District Women's Suffrage Society and stood as Labour Party candidate in the 1918 general election for the newly created University of Wales constituency, losing to former Flintshire Liberal MP Herbert Lewis. She was the first woman to stand in a parliamentary election in Wales. A copy of her election address is held at the National Library of Wales.

General election 1918: University of Wales
Party	Candidate	Votes	%	±%
	Herbert Lewis	739	80.8	N/A
	Millicent Mackenzie	176	19.2	N/A
Majority		563	61.6	N/A
Turnout		915	85.8	N/A
	Liberal win			

== Legacy and commemoration ==
John Mackenzie, her husband, died in December 1935 in their home in the village of Brockweir near Chepstow in Gloucestershire. She edited his autobiographical notes and published them in 1936. When the Brockweir town hall was built in 1937, she donated the money for the building and called it the Mackenzie Hall in honour of her husband.

Millicent Mackenzie died on 10 December 1942 in Brockweir.

In 2022, Cardiff Council announced that a park was being named in honour of Millicent Mackenzie. Parc Mackenzie is situated behind National Museum Cardiff, between Park Place and Museum Avenue.

== Books published ==
- Freedom in Education An Inquiry into Its Meaning, Value And Conditions by H Millicent Mackenzie. Hodder & Stoughton Ltd (1905) ASIN B000KZGHCA
- Hegel's Educational Theory and Practice by H. Millicent Hughes Mackenzie. S. Sonnenschein & Co., Ltd (1909) ASIN B00087QADG
- Moral Education: The Training of the Teacher by Millicent MacKenzie 1909
