= Queen Mary's High School =

Location
- Upper Forster Street; Walsall, West Midlands, WS4 2AE; England; 52.5895°N 1.976°W

Information
- Type: Grammar school; Academy
- Motto: Semper Fidelis (Always Faithful)
- Established: 1893
- Local authority: Walsall Borough Council
- Department for Education URN: 136777 Tables
- Ofsted: Reports
- Chair of Governors: T.J. Normanton
- Head Teacher: Nicola Daniel
- Gender: Girls ('mixed' sixth form)
- Age: 11 to 18
- Enrolment: 930
- Houses: Austen; Brontë; Eliot; Shelley
- Colours: Green, yellow,
- Website: http://www.qmhs.org.uk/

Queen Mary's High School, situated on Upper Forster Street, just outside Walsall town centre, is an all-female grammar school, with entry in Year 7 decided by the 11+ and entry into the Sixth Form decided by GCSE results. It is twinned with Queen Mary's Grammar School, and like the Grammar School is part of the Queen Mary's Foundation.

The main body of the school is a girls’ school, but the Sixth Form is coeducational.

The school gained an outstanding level in the Ofsted report when it was last inspected in 2021.

The school was a Language College and historically required students to study two languages to GCSE standard.

Class sizes in the lower school are currently around 30 girls. Sixth-form classes have a minimum of about 8 students and a maximum of 25.

The school is divided into houses named after famous 19th-century female authors – Austen (after Jane Austen), Bronte (after Emily Brontë), Eliot (after George Eliot) and Shelley (after Mary Shelley), the latter being a new house in the 2012/13 academic year. Each house has a member of staff in charge of it, a captain from Year 13 (upper sixth form) and a vice-captain from Year 12 (lower sixth form).

Alumni of the school include performer Meera Syal and nanoscientist Jessica Boland.

== Notable staff ==
- Barbara Foxley was head here
