= List of local government organizations =

This is a list of local government organizations i.e. associations or groupings of local governments and municipalities.

== Australia ==
- Australian Local Government Association
  - Local Government NSW
  - Local Government Association of Northern Territory
  - Local Government Association of Queensland
  - Local Government Association of South Australia
  - Local Government Association of Tasmania
  - Municipal Association of Victoria
  - Western Australian Local Government Association

== Belgium ==
- Union of Belgian Cities and Municipalities
- Association of Flemish Cities and Municipalities
- Association of the City and the Municipalities of the Brussels-Capital Region
- Association of Flemish Cities and Municipalities
- Union des Villes et Communes de Wallonie

== Bangladesh ==
- Association of Central Councils
- Bangladesh Local Government Association
- White Crescent Society Local Authorities

== Canada ==
=== Association francophone des municipalités du Nouveau-Brunswick (AFMNB) ===
Established: 1989

=== Association of Manitoba Municipalities (AMM) ===
Founded: 1999
Formed from the merger of:

- The Union of Manitoba Municipalities (UMM) – 1905-1999
- Manitoba Association of Urban Municipalities (MAUM) – est. 1949 – formerly the Manitoba Urban Association (MUA)

All municipalities in Manitoba are members

=== Association of Municipalities of Ontario (AMO) ===
Founded: 1972
Formed from the merger of:

- Ontario Municipal Association (OMA) – 1899-1972
- Association of Ontario Mayors and Reeves (AOMR) – 1944-1972
- Association of Counties and Regions (Ontario) (ACRO) – 1960-1982
- Ontario Association of Rural Municipalities (OARM) – 1933-1982

Current sub-associations within AMO:

- Association francaise des municipalités de l’Ontario (AFMO)
- Northwestern Ontario Municipal Association (NOMA)
- Federation of Northern Ontario Municipalities (FONOM)
- Eastern Ontario Wardens Group
- Western Ontario Wardens Group
- Large Urban Mayors Caucus Ontario (LUMCO)
- Regional Chairs Group
- Rural Ontario Municipal Association (ROMA)
- Organization of Small Urban Municipalities (OSUM)

=== Association des municipalités bilingues du Manitoba (AMBM) ===
Founded: 1995

=== Association of Alberta Municipalities (ABmunis) ===
Founded: 1905
Formerly the Union of Alberta Municipalities (UAM) and Alberta Urban Municipalities Association (AUMA)

=== Cities of New Brunswick Association – Association des cités du Nouveau-Brunswick (CNBA-ACNB) ===
Founded: 1948/1949

=== Federation of Canadian Municipalities (FCM) ===
Founded: 1937 Formed from the merger of the:

- Union of Canadian Municipalities (UCM) – 1901-1935
- Dominion Conference of Mayors (DCM) – 1935-1937

Formerly the Canadian Federation of Mayors and Municipalities (CFMM)

=== Federation of Prince Edward Island Municipalities (FPEIM) ===
Founded: 1957

=== Fédération Québécoise des Municipalités (FQM) ===
Founded: 1944

=== Municipalities Newfoundland and Labrador (MNL) ===
Founded: 1951
Formerly the Newfoundland Federation of Municipalities (NFM) and the Newfoundland and Labrador Federation of Municipalities (NLFM)

=== New North - SANC Services Inc. ===
Founded: 1996
Formerly the Saskatchewan Association of Northern Communities (SANC)

=== Provincial Association of Resort Communities of Saskatchewan (PARCS) ===
Founded: 1996

=== Rural Municipalities of Alberta (RMA) ===
Founded 1909
Formerly the Albert Association of Municipal Districts (AAMD), the Alberta Local Improvement Districts Association (ALIDA), and Alberta Association of Municipal Districts and Counties (AAMDC)

=== Saskatchewan Association of Rural Municipalities (SARM) ===
Founded: 1905
Formerly the Saskatchewan Local Improvement Districts Association (SLIDA)

=== Saskatchewan Urban Municipalities Association (SUMA) ===
Founded: 1906
Formerly the Union of Saskatchewan Municipalities (USM)

=== Union of British Columbia Municipalities (UBCM) ===
Founded: 1905
Area Associations within UBCM:

- Association of Kootenay and Boundary Local Governments (AKBLG)
- Association of Vancouver Island and Coastal Communities (AVICC)
- Lower Mainland Local Government Association (LMLGA)
- North Central Local Government Association (NCLA)
- Southern Interior Local Government Association (SILGA)

=== Union des municipalités du Québec (UMQ) ===
Founded: 1919

=== Union of Municipalities of New Brunswick (UMNB) ===
Founded: 1995
Formed for the merger of:

- Association of Villages of New Brunswick (AVNB)
- Towns of New Brunswick Association – L’Association des Villes du Nouveau-Brunswick (TNBA-AVNB)

=== Nova Scotia Federation of Municipalities (NSFM) ===
Founded: 1906

=== Former Municipal Associations in Canada ===
Towns and Villages of New Brunswick (TVNB)

- 1966-1974
- Split into Association of Villages of New Brunswick (AVNB) and Towns of New Brunswick Association – L’Association des Villes du Nouveau-Brunswick (TNBA-AVNB)
- AVNB and TNBA-AVNB merged to become UMNB

Union of New Brunswick Municipalities (UNBM)

- 1907-1970
- Last convention: 1966
- Last meeting: 1968
- Disbanded after the New Brunswick Equal Opportunities Program dissolved county governments

== Croatia ==
- Joint Council of Municipalities (Council of Municipalities with a Serbian majority population established on the basis of Erdut Agreement)
- Croatian community of municipalities (Association that connects 347 of 428 municipalities across Croatia)
- Association of Towns of the Republic of Croatia (Association that connects 126 of 128 towns across Croatia)
- Croatian community of counties (Association that connects all 20 counties and city of Zagreb)

== Czech Republic ==
- Sdružení místních samospráv ČR
- Svaz měst a obcí České republiky
- Asociace krajů České republiky

== Kingdom of Denmark ==
=== Denmark ===
- Kommunernes Landsforening (all 98 municipalities in Denmark are members)
- Danske Regioner (all 5 regions in Denmark are members)

=== Faroe Islands ===
- Føroya Kommunufelag (municipal organization of the Faroe Islands)

=== Greenland ===
- KANUKOKA (municipal organization of Greenland)

== Germany ==
- Deutscher Städtetag (Association of German Cities)
- German Association of Towns and Municipalities
- Bayerischer Gemeindetag
- Gemeinde- und Städtebund Rheinland-Pfalz
- Gemeinde- und Städtebund Thüringen
- Gemeindetag Baden-Württemberg
- Hessischer Städte- und Gemeindebund
- Hessischer Städtetag
- Niedersächsischer Städtetag
- Niedersächsischer Städte- und Gemeindebund
- Saarländischer Städte- und Gemeindetag
- Sächsischer Städte- und Gemeindetag
- Schleswig-Holsteinischer Gemeindetag
- Städte- und Gemeindebund Brandenburg
- Städte- und Gemeindebund Sachsen-Anhalt
- Städte- und Gemeindetag Mecklenburg-Vorpommern
- Städte- und Gemeindebund Nordrhein-Westfalen
- Städtebund Schleswig-Holstein
- Städtetag Rheinland-Pfalz

== Iran ==
- the Union of Municipalities (Defunct / Disbanded)
- Supreme Council of Provinces
- Organization of Municipalities and Villages of the country

== Ireland ==
- Local Government Management Agency

== Italy ==
- Standing Committee for EuromMediterranean Partnership of local and regional authorities COPPEM -
- National Association of Italian Municipalities

== Japan ==
- Greater Nagoya Initiative

== Netherlands ==
- Interprovinciaal Overleg
- Association of Netherlands Municipalities
- Samenwerkingsverband Regio Eindhoven

== Norway ==
- Landssamanslutninga av Vasskraftkommunar (It groups municipalities that are involved in hydropower production)

== Philippines ==
Each local government level and elective position has its own league:

- Union of Local Authorities of the Philippines
- League of Provinces of the Philippines
- League of Vice Governors of the Philippines
- Provincial Board Members League of the Philippines
- League of Cities of the Philippines
- League of Municipalities of the Philippines
- Vice Mayors' League of the Philippines
- Philippine Councilors League
- League of Barangays in the Philippines
- Metro Manila Councilors League

These are demographic-specific leagues:

- Lady Local Legislators' League
- National Movement of Young Legislators

== Poland ==
- The Association of Polish Cities (Związek Miast Polskich)
- The Union of Polish Metropolises (Unia Metropolii Polskich)
- Association of Polish Counties (Związek Powiatów Polskich)
- The Union of Rural Communes of the Republic of Poland (Związek Gmin Wiejskich RP)

== Slovakia ==
- Združenie miest a obcí Slovenska
- Únia miest Slovenska

== Slovenia ==
- Association of Municipalities and Towns of Slovenia

== South Africa ==
- South African Local Government Association

== Spain ==
- Spanish Federation of Municipalities and Provinces
- Andalusian Federation of Municipalities and Provinces, in the Autonomous Community of Andalusia
- Aragonese Federation of Municipalities, Counties and Provinces, in the Autonomous Community of Aragón
- Asturian Federation of Councils, in the Autonomous Community of Asturias
- Federation of Local Entities of the Balearic Islands, in the Autonomous Community of the Balearic Islands
- Canary Islands Federation of Municipalities, in the Autonomous Community of the Canary Islands
- Federation of Municipalities of Cantabria, in the Autonomous Community of Cantabria
- Regional Federation of Municipalities and Provinces of Castilla y León, in the Autonomous Community of Castile and León
- Federation of Municipalities and Provinces of Castilla-La Mancha, in the Autonomous Community of Castilla-La Mancha
- Federation of Municipalities of Catalonia, in the Autonomous Community of Catalonia
- Federation of Municipalities and Provinces of Extremadura, in the Autonomous Community of Extremadura
- Galician Federation of Municipalities and Provinces, in the Autonomous Community of Galicia
- Federation of Municipalities of Madrid, in the Autonomous Community of Madrid
- Federation of Municipalities of the Region of Murcia, in the Autonomous Community of Murcia
- Navarrese Federation of Municipalities and Councils, in the Autonomous Community of Navarre
- Riojan Federation of Municipalities, in the Autonomous Community of La Rioja
- Association of Basque Municipalities-EUDEL, in the Autonomous community of the Basque Country
- Association of Municipalities for Independence

== Sweden ==
- Swedish Association of Local Authorities and Regions (Sveriges Kommuner och Landsting)
- National Association of Swedish Eco-Municipalities (Sveriges Ekokommuner)

== Uganda ==
- Uganda Local Governments Association

== Ukraine ==
- Association of Amalgamated Territorial Communities (Всеукраїнська Асоціація об’єднаних територіальних громад)
- The Association of Ukrainian Cities (Асоціація міст України)

== United Kingdom ==
- Local Government Association (England and Wales)
- Association of Port Health Authorities
- Association of Drainage Authorities

=== England ===
- East of England Local Government Association
- London Councils
- East Midlands Councils
- Association of North East Councils
- North West Regional Leaders Board
- South East England Councils
- South West Councils
- West Midlands Councils
- Local Government Yorkshire and Humber

=== Northern Ireland ===
- Northern Ireland Local Government Association

=== Scotland ===
- Convention of Scottish Local Authorities

=== Wales ===
- Welsh Local Government Association

== United States ==
- National League of Cities
- United States Conference of Mayors

=== Associations of counties ===
- National Association of Counties
- Arizona Association of Counties
- Association of Arkansas Counties
- California State Association of Counties
- Florida Association of Counties
- Hawaii State Association of Counties
- Idaho Association of Counties
- Illinois State Association of Counties
- Association of Indiana Counties
- Iowa State Association of Counties
- Kansas Association of Counties
- Kentucky Association of Counties
- Police Jury Association of Louisiana
- Maine County Commissioners Association
- Maryland Association of Counties
- Michigan Association of Counties
- Association of Minnesota Counties
- Missouri Association of Counties
- Montana Association of Counties
- Nevada Association of Counties
- New Hampshire Association of Counties
- New Mexico Association of Counties
- New York Association of Counties
- North Carolina Association of County Commissioners
- North Dakota Association of Counties
- Association of Oregon Counties

=== Special districts ===
- National Special District Association
- California Special Districts Association
- Special District Association of Colorado
- Florida Association of Special Districts
- Special Districts Association of Oregon
- South Carolina Association of Special Purpose Districts
- Texas Special Districts Coalition
- Utah Association of Special Districts
- Wyoming Association of Special Districts
- Association of California Water Agencies
- Nebraska Association of Resources Districts
- Washington Association of Public Hospital Districts
- Washington Association of Sewer and Water Districts
- Washington Public Utility Districts Association
- North Dakota Recreation and Park Association
- Tennessee Association of Utility Districts
- Association of Texas Soil and Water Conservation Districts

==== Fire districts ====
- Fire Districts Association of California
- Association of Fire Districts of Illinois
- Association of Fire Districts of the State of New York

=== School districts ===
- National School Boards Association
- Alabama Association of School Boards
- California School Boards Association
- Texas Association of School Boards

== International ==
- Alpine Pearls
- Arab Towns Organization
- Council of European Municipalities and Regions
- Euro Mediterranean Partnership of Local and Regional Authorities
- League of Historical Cities
- Municipal Alliance for Peace
- Organization of World Heritage Cities
- Sister Cities International

== See also ==
- Decentralization
- List of intergovernmental organizations
- Localism
- Regionalism
- Tertiary government
