= Eiskogel =

Eiskogel ("ice peak") may refer to the following mountains:

- Eiskogel (Tennen Mountains), 2321 m, near Werfenweng in the Pongau, Salzburg state, Austria
- Eiskogel (Upper Austrian Prealps), 1,087 m, between Almtal und Kremstal, Upper Austria
- Großer Eiskogel, 3547 m, in the Ortler Alps, South Tyrol, Italy
- Kleiner Eiskogel, 3105 m, in the Ortler Alps, South Tyrol, Italy
