= LHC (disambiguation) =

The Large Hadron Collider is a particle accelerator and collider on the Franco-Swiss border near Geneva, Switzerland.

LHC also may refer to:

- Lahore High Court, a high court in Lahore, Punjab, Pakistan
- Lausanne Hockey Club, an ice hockey team from Lausanne, Switzerland
- League of Historical Cities
- Les Horribles Cernettes (English: The Horrible CERN Girls), a parody pop group in France
- Light-harvesting complex, a biological structure involved in photosynthesis
- Linköpings HC, an ice hockey team from Linköping, Sweden
- Little Hoover Commission, an independent California state oversight agency
- The Landmark Hotel and Casino, Las Vegas, closed 1990
- Lake Havasu City, Arizona, United States
