= Association of Provinces of the Netherlands =

Provincial association

The Association of Provinces of the Netherlands (Dutch: Interprovinciaal Overleg; IPO) is the association of the twelve provinces of the Netherlands. The association looks after provincial interests and forms a platform for exchanging knowledge and experience among the twelve Dutch provinces. The IPO also stimulates and takes the initiative in reform programmes.

The executive of the IPO consists of thirteen members, made up of one from each province (who can be a member of that province's Gedeputeerde Staten, or its King's Commissioner) plus a chairperson. The chair is vacant. The IPO's general assembly is made up of twenty-four members of the States-Provincial (2 from each province).

The office of the IPO presents provincial interests through relations with the central government, the European Union, the Association of Netherlands Municipalities, the Unie van Waterschappen, the National Civil Pension Fund and with social organizations.

== See also ==
- List of micro-regional organizations

Meta.Wikipedia.org
