= Großer Eiskogel =

Mountain in Italy

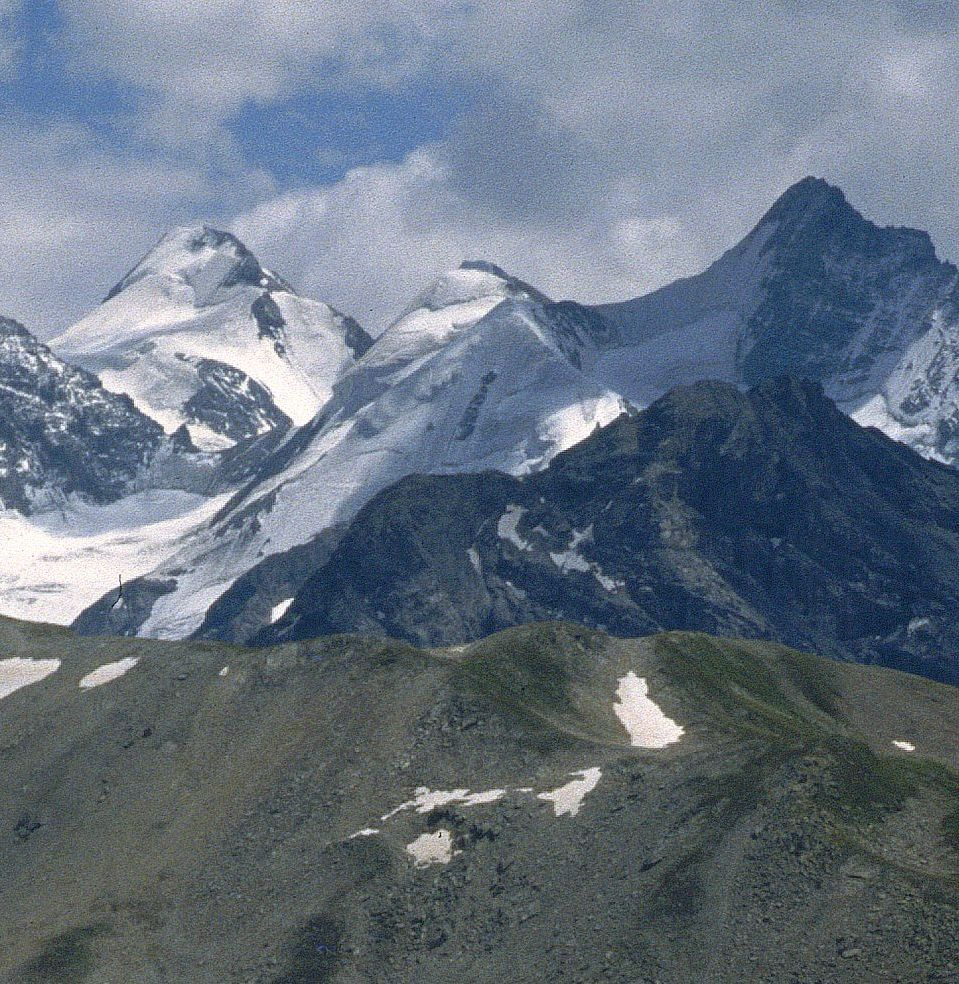
- The Große Eiskogel in the centre. Left: the Zebrù; right: the Thurwieserspitze

Highest point
- Elevation: 3,547 m s.l.m. (11,637 ft)
- Coordinates: 46°29′52″N 10°31′46″E

Geography
- Location within Italy
- Location: Border of South Tyrol
- Parent range: Ortler Alps

The Große Eiskogel (Italian: Gran Coni di Ghiaccio) is a mountain in the Ortler Alps in South Tyrol, Italy, which rises to a height of 3,547 m s.l.m. (or according to other sources, 3549, 3544 or 3530 m).

== Location and surroundings ==
The Große Eiskogel is the easternmost peak in the Kristallkamm, a mountain range in the Ortler Alps that runs from the Stilfser Joch in the west to the Ortler Pass. It is located in the South Tyrol part of this mountain group near the border with Lombardy and is protected within the Stilfserjoch National Park. In the east its summit block drops to the Ortler Pass (3,353 m), behind which Zebrù (3,735 m) and the Ortler (3,905 m) rise. In the southwest it is separated from the nearby Thurwieserspitze (3,652 m) by the Thurwieserjoch saddle (3,480 m). Towards the northwest a ridge runs away in the direction of the Trafoital, on which rises the Kleine Eiskogel (3,105 m).

== Ascent ==
Despite its considerable height, the Große Eiskogel is a little-known South Tyrolean high summit. This is partly due to its remoteness, partly to its location between significantly higher and therefore more prominent mountains. The summit, which is always covered in firn, can only be reached via glaciers and Alpine crossings. It is often crossed when climbing the Thurwieserspitze. The closest support points for mountaineers are the Rifugio Quinto Alpini and the Bergl Hut.

== Literature ==
- Peter Holl: Alpenvereinsführer Ortleralpen , 9th edition, Munich 2003, ISBN 3-7633-1313-3
