= Irena Majcen =

Slovenian agricultural engineer

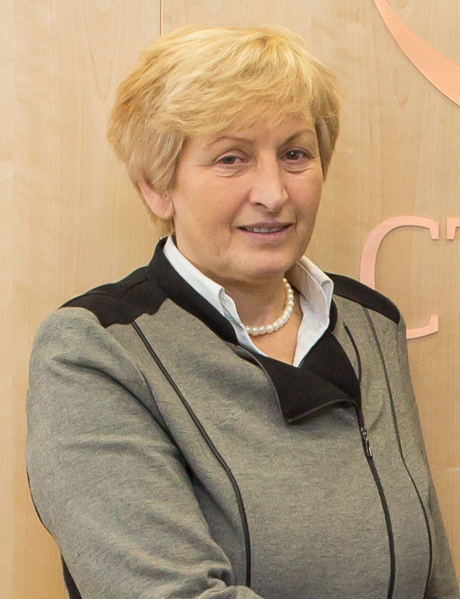
- Majcen in 2016

Minister of Environment and Spatial Planning
- In office 2014–2018
- President: Borut Pahor
- Prime Minister: Miro Cerar
- Preceded by: Position created
- Succeeded by: Simon Zajc

Personal details
- Born: 2 March 1958 (age 68) Novo Mesto, Slovenia, Yugoslavia
- Party: Democratic Party of Pensioners of Slovenia (since 2010)
- Other political affiliations: Slovenian People's Party (until 2010)
- Education: University of Ljubljana
- Occupation: Agricultural engineer

Irena Majcen (born 2 March 1958) is a Slovenian agricultural engineer and civil servant who was Minister of Environment and Spatial Planning from 2014 until 2018. Prior to becoming minister, she was mayor of the Municipality of Slovenska Bistrica (2005–2010) and head of their Department of Agriculture, Food, Forestry, and Economy and Department for Environment, Spatial Affairs, Transport, and Communications.

== Biography ==
Irena Majcen was born on 2 March 1958 in Novo Mesto and educated at the University of Ljubljana Biotechnical Faculty (graduating in 1980). She began working at the Slovenska Bistrica Agricultural Cooperative immediately afterwards and later became an agricultural engineer. In 1991, she was elected to the Municipality of Slovenska Bistrica Executive Council. She later served as a department head for the municipality; first for the Department of Agriculture, Food, Forestry, and Economy, and eventually for the Department for Environment, Spatial Affairs, Transport, and Communications.

Majcen was also a co-founder and national vice-president of the Slovenian People's Party. In 2005, she was elected mayor of the municipality of Slovenska Bistrica and was re-elected in 2006. She continued to serve until 2010, when she lost re-election as candidate for Democratic Party of Pensioners of Slovenia, which she had moved to that year. She ran for a seat in the National Assembly twice: in 1992 and 2011.

Majcen joined the Association of Municipalities and Towns of Slovenia committee in 2005 and was promoted to vice-president of the entire organisation in 2006. After joining the European Committee of the Regions in 2005 as a substitute, she was promoted to chair of Slovenia's European Committee of the Regions delegation in 2006, remaining there as late as 2008.

In 2014, the Democratic Party of Pensioners of Slovenia (DeSUS) nominated Majcen to succeed Tomaž Gantar as the Minister of Environment and Spatial Planning She accepted the nomination and later served as minister for at least four years. She was succeeded in the position by Simon Zajc. She was vice-president of DeSUS until her resignation in March 2021.
