= Euro Mediterranean Partnership of Local and Regional Authorities =

The Standing Committee for Euro Mediterranean Partnership of Local and Regional Authorities (COPPEM), was created in 2000 to promote dialogue and development between local and regional authorities in the Euro-Mediterranean area.

COPPEM is an international body of local and regional authorities of the EuroMediterranean area. The Secretariat of COPPEM is based in Palermo (Italy).

The international network of COPPEM was created in 2000 with the support of the Arab Towns Organization and the Council of European Municipalities and Regions, following the definition of a settlement agreed in Gaza by representatives of local and regional authorities. The first Plenary Assembly, attended by the 37 Euro-Mediterranean delegations, took place in Palermo on 27–28 November 2000. Successively, COPPEM's General Assembly has been held once a year in several Mediterranean countries. COPPEM promotes local and decentralised cooperation and development by pursuing the objectives set out in the Barcelona Declaration (1995) through the European Union's financial instruments.

Institutional representatives of the local and regional authorities of the signatory countries of the Barcelona Declaration, and of those who join the Union for the Mediterranean, are members of COPPEM. Important personalities from the academic, scientific and cultural world are also recognized as members of COPPEM. The participation of the Persian Gulf countries as observers is planned. Also some leading figures of the academic, scientific and cultural world are recognized as COPPEM members.

The operational bodies of COPPEM are:

- the General Assembly

- the Presidency Council

- the President and Vice-presidents

- the Secretary General

COPPEM identifies four priority areas for its action:

• international relations and migration;

• political-institutional area, equal opportunities, human rights and youth;

• culture, innovation and sustainable development;

• programmes and projects.

The organisation's headquarters is in Palermo, Italy.

On the basis of these priority areas, COPPEM members can act by proposing new initiatives and participating in the various activities that the Secretariat develops and carries out.

2020 was a pivotal year for COPPEM membership, with the four-year deadline for the renewal of international delegations that join, free of charge, the organization.

== See also ==
- Euro-Mediterranean Source
- List of micro-regional organizations
