= National Association of Municipalities (Faroe Islands) =

Original municipal organization of the Faroe Islands

The National Association of Municipalities (Føroya Kommunufelag) is the original municipal organisation of the Faroe Islands. All Faroese municipalities except those in Kommunusamskipan Føroya are members of Føroya Kommunufelag. Føroya Kommunfelag also hosts the municipal environmental bureau, Agendaskrivstovan.

== See also ==
- List of micro-regional organizations
