= Association of Amalgamated Territorial Communities =

- Всеукраїнська Асоціація об’єднаних територіальних громад
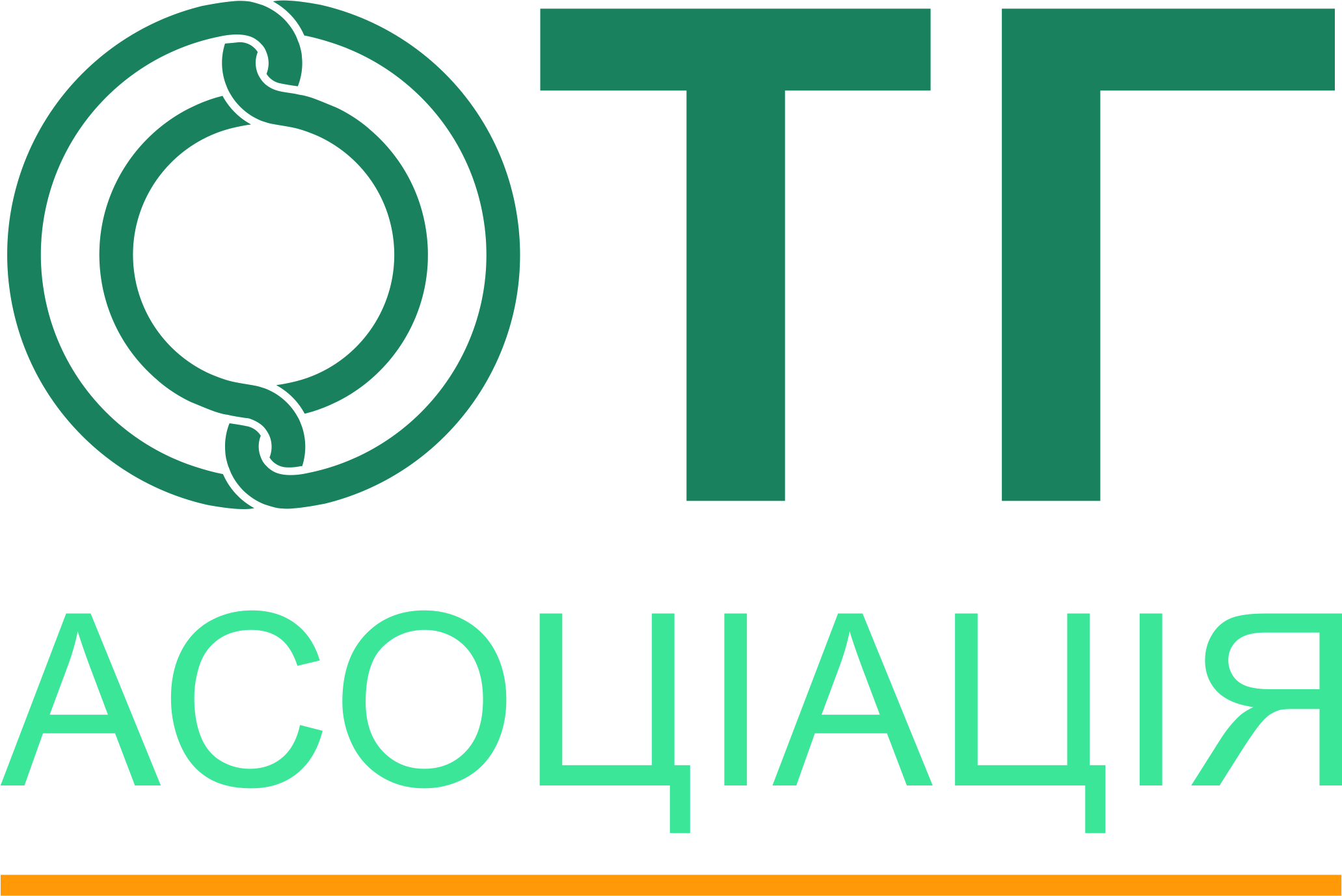
- Abbreviation: AACT
- Formation: Nov 25, 2016; 9 years ago
- Type: Local government organization
- Legal status: Non-profit organization
- Headquarters: Kyiv, Ukraine
- Region served: Ukraine
- Members: 490
- Chairperson: Oleksandr Korinnyi
- Chief Executive Officer: Valentina Poltavets
- Website: www.hromady.org

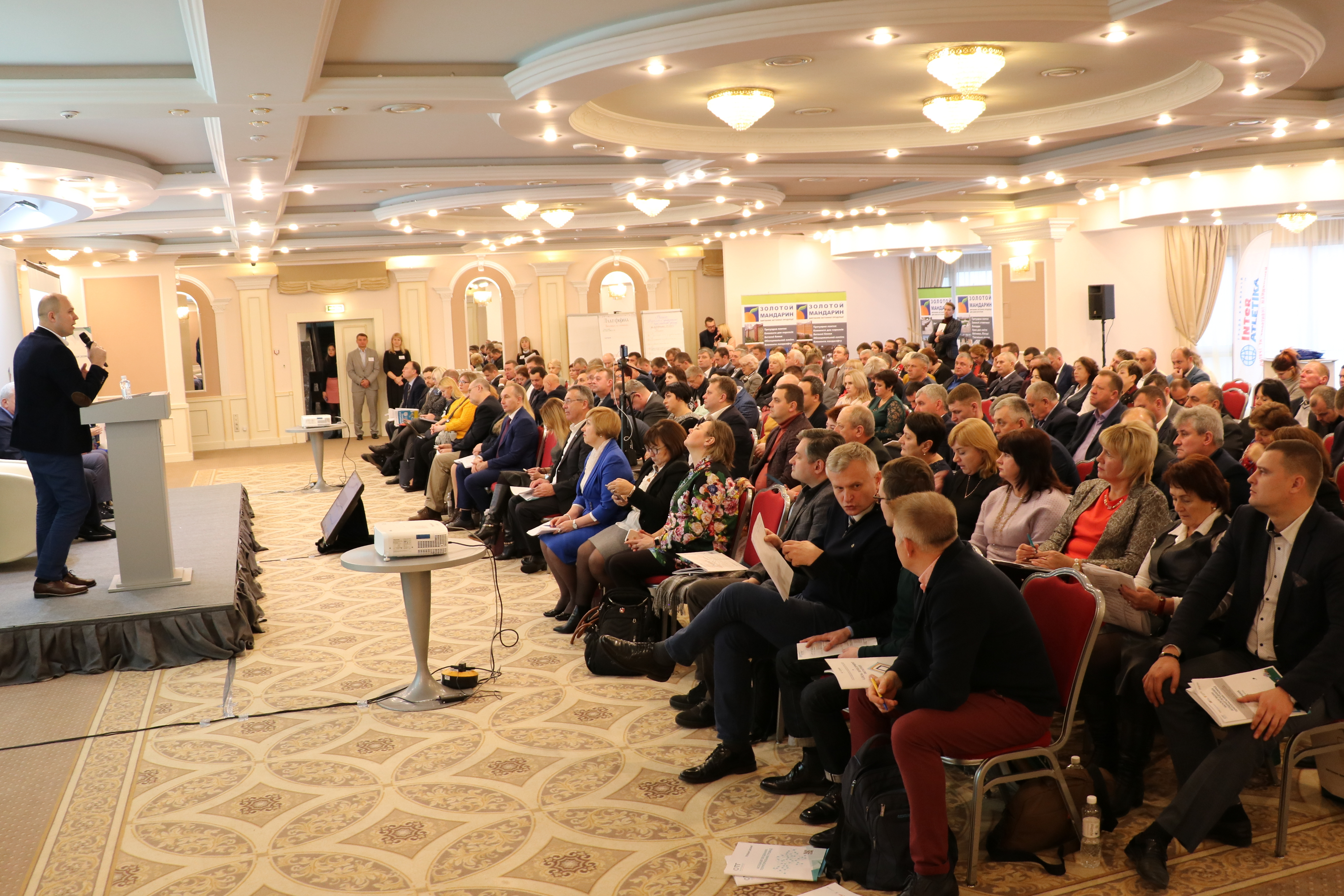
Congress of Association of Amalgamated Territorial Communities (Nov 25, 2019)

The Association of Amalgamated Territorial Communities (AACT, Ukrainian: Всеукраїнська Асоціація об’єднаних територіальних громад, romanized: Vseukrayinsʹka Asotsiatsiya ob'yednanykh terytorialʹnykh hromad, lit. 'All-Ukrainian Association of United Territorial Communities') is an organization of municipal government representing over 490 Ukrainian amalgamated municipalities. Its stated purpose is to provide political and strategic leadership to represent the interests of local municipalities established in the process of voluntary association of territorial communities after Euromaidan. The AACT was founded in 2016.

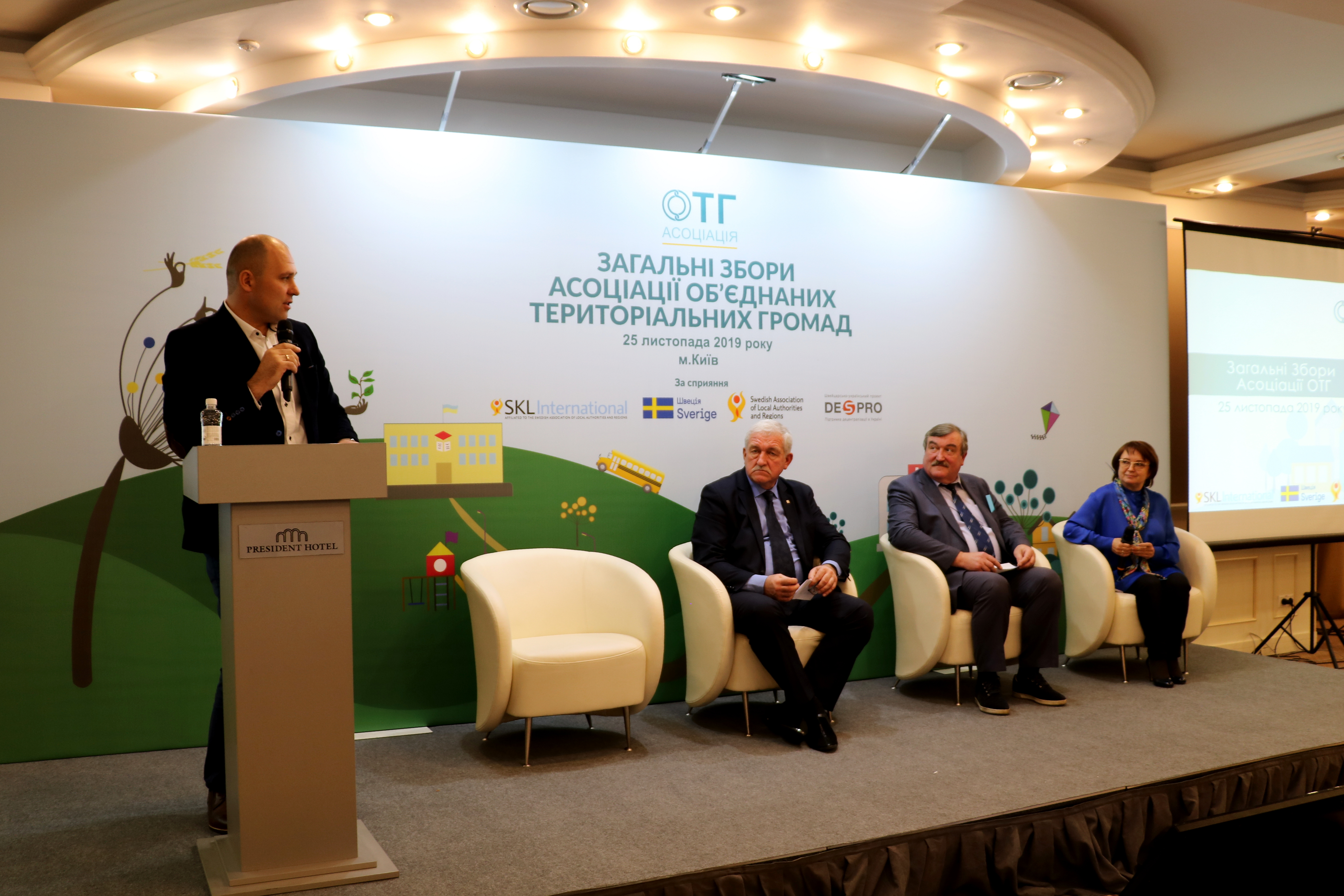
The Founders of the association during the Congress, Kyiv November 25, 2019

== See also ==
- Official website
