= Eiskogel (Tennen Mountains) =

Peak in Austria

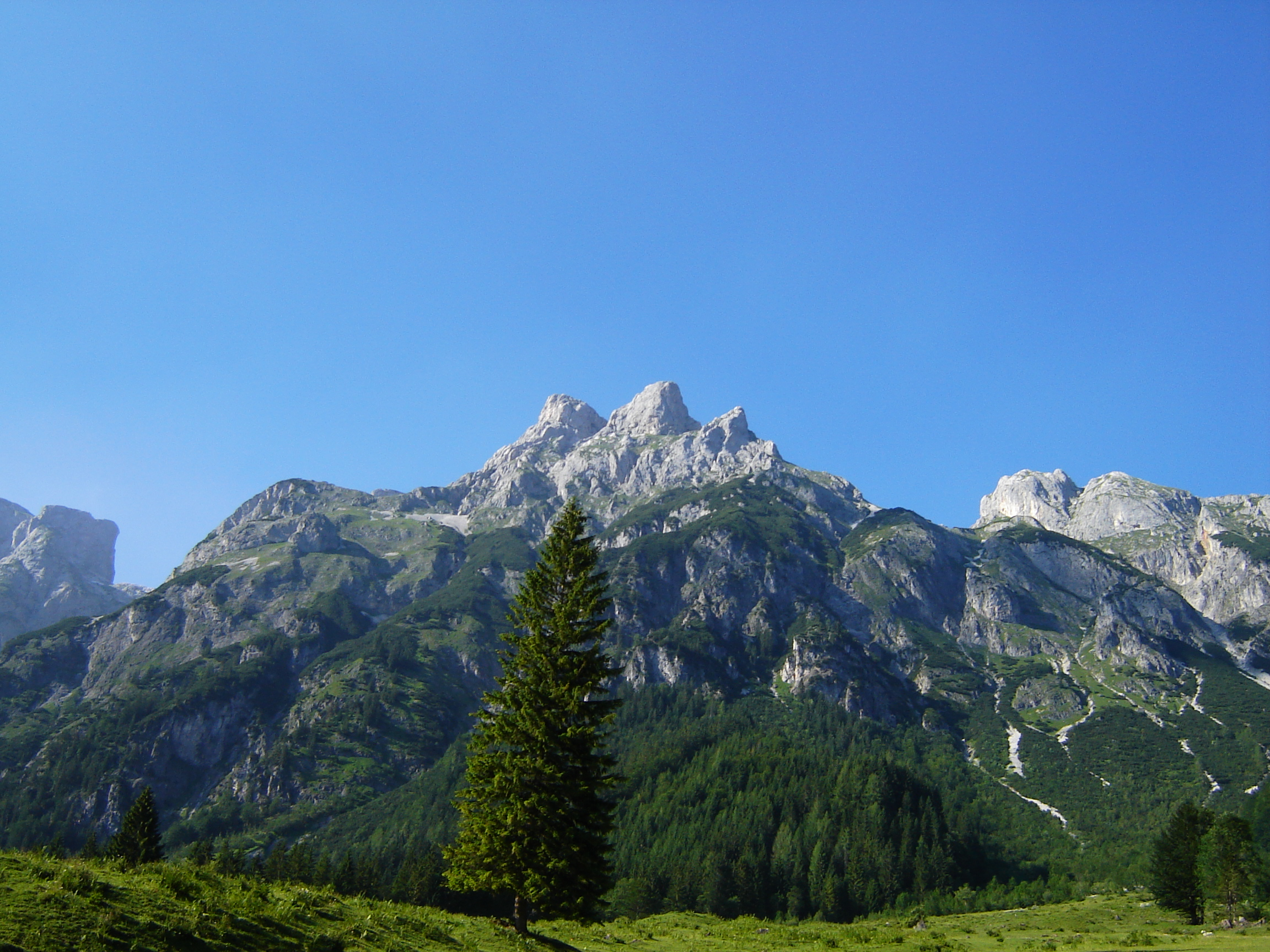

Highest point
- Elevation: 2,321 m (AA) (7,615 ft)
- Prominence: 2,321−2,165 m ↓ Eiskogelboden
- Isolation: 0.8 km → Schartwand
- Coordinates: 47°29′48″N 13°16′54″E

Geography
- Location within Austria
- Location: Salzburg, Austria
- Parent range: Tennen Mountains

Geology
- Rock age: Norian – Rhaetian
- Rock type: Dachstein limestone

Climbing
- Normal route: Wengerau – Dr. Heinrich Hackel Hut – Stiegl – Tauernscharte – Nordostflanke – Eiskogel

The Eiskogel (2,321 m (AA)) is one of the best known peaks in the Tennen Mountains (Tennengebirge) which are part of the Northern Limestone Alps in the state of Salzburg. On its south and west sides the mountain has rock faces up to 1,000 metres high. By contrast, to the north and east it descends relatively gently down grass and schrofen slopes to the broad plateau of the Tennen Mountains.

== Location ==
The double summit of the Eiskogel rises on the southern rim of the Tennen Mountains at Werfenweng and not far from the border between the Tennengau and Pongau. The Great Eiskogel is often a destination of mountain climbers. At the foot of the summit block is the Eiskogelhöhle; further east rises the Tauernkogel (Tennen Mountains).

== Routes ==
The Eiskogel, like most of the other peaks in the Tennen Mountains is easy to summit and requires no climbing. The normal route is a popular ski tour in winter and forms part of a ski crossing of the Tennen. The only important route is the path from the south:

- From the Wengerau, time: 4 hours, height difference: 1,350 metres

It starts in the Wengerau by Werfenweng and runs initially to the Dr.-Heinrich-Hackel-Hütte. It makes its way up slopes covered in mountain pine and through a scree-covered cirque between the Napf and the Tauernkogel, climbing up to the Stiegl. This point is rocky and very exposed (level I according to the UIAA), but secured. Next it runs up to the Tauern arete (Tauernscharte) and then continues without any difficulties over grassy slopes to the Eiskogel.

== Literature ==
- Albert Precht: Alpenvereinsführer Tennengebirge. Bergverlag Rother, Munich 1986, ISBN 3-7633-1246-3.
