= Localism (politics) =

Political philosophy prioritizing local governance and community control

Localism is a range of political philosophies which prioritize the local over the national or international. Generally, localism supports local production and consumption of goods, local control of government, and promotion of local history, local culture and local identity. Localism can be contrasted with regionalism and centralized government, with its opposite being found in unitarism.

Localism can also refer to a systematic approach to organizing a central government so that local autonomy is retained rather than following the usual pattern of government and political power becoming centralized over time.

On a conceptual level, there are important affinities between localism and deliberative democracy. This concerns mainly the democratic goal of engaging citizens in decisions that affect them. Consequently, localism will encourage stronger democratic and political participatory forums and widening public sphere connectivity.

== History ==
Localists assert that throughout the world's history, most social and economic institutions are scaled at the local level, as opposed to regional, interregional, or global. Through ongoing forms of colonialism, imperialism and industrialisation local scales become less central. Most proponents of localism position themselves as defending aspects of this way of life; the phrase "relocalization" is often used in this sense.

In the 20th century, localism drew heavily on the writings of Leopold Kohr, E. F. Schumacher, Wendell Berry, and Kirkpatrick Sale, among others. More generally, localism draws on a wide range of movements and concerns and it proposes that by re-localizing democratic and economic relationships, social, economic and environmental problems will be more definable and solutions more easily created. They include anarchism, bioregionalism, environmentalism, the Greens, and more specific concerns about food, monetary policy and education. Political parties of all persuasions have also occasionally favored the devolution of power to local authorities. In this vein Alan Milburn, a UK Labour Party MP, has spoken of "making services more locally accountable, devolving more power to local communities and, in the process, forging a modern relationship between the state, citizens and services"

Beginning in the 1960s, a particularly visible strain of localism in the United States was a movement started by Alice Waters to buy locally produced products. This movement originated with organic farming and likely gained impetus because of growing dissatisfaction with organic certification and the failing economic model of industrial agriculture for small farmers. While the advocates of local consumption draw on protectionist arguments, they also appealed primarily to an environmental argument: that pollution caused by transporting goods was a major externality in a global economy, and one that "localvores" could greatly diminish. Also, environmental issues can be addressed when decision-making power is held by those affected by the issues instead of power sources that do not understand the needs of local communities.

== Political philosophy ==
Localism as a philosophy is related to the principle of subsidiarity.

In the early 21st century, localists have frequently found themselves aligned with critics of globalisation. Variants of localism are prevalent within the Green movement. According to an article in International Socialism, localism of this sort seeks to "answer to the problems created by globalisation" with "calls to minimise international trade and to seek to establish economies based on ‘local’ self-sufficiency only."

Some localists believe that society should be organised politically along community lines, with each community being free to conduct its own business in whatever fashion its people see fit. The size of the communities is defined such that their members are both familiar and dependent on each other, a size something along the lines of a small town or village.

In reference to localism, Edward Goldsmith, former editor of The Ecologist magazine, claims: "The problems facing the world today can only be solved by restoring the functioning of those natural systems which once satisfied our needs, i.e. by fully exploiting those incomparable resources which are individual people, families, communities and ecosystems, which together make up the biosphere or real world"

Tip O'Neill, a longtime Democratic Speaker of the House in the US Congress, once famously declared that "All politics is local". He eventually wrote a book by that name: All Politics Is Local: And Other Rules of the Game.

=== Localism and populism ===
Wayne Yeung questions the assumption that localism is a sub-school of European-American populism. Yeung raised an example in which localism is a cultural or civic value rather than a value that supports ethnic understanding in Hong Kong identity politics.

Jane Wills argued that an increasing number of populist politicians are endorsing localism as a framework for public policy. She defined populism as a form of politics that involves people speaking in a register that is authentic to the experiences and needs of those people. In other words, most likely Populist Party policies would contradict parties that support the elites. She also used the term "anti-politics" to describe localist politicians because they stand against mainstream politics. She used the UK Independence Party (UKIP) as an example of a party adopting localism into their policies. Mainstream politicians from the Conservative, Labour and Liberal Democrat parties were threatened by the rise of UKIP.

== Localism and developing countries ==
Many localists are concerned with the problems of developing countries. Many advocate that developing countries should aim to rely on their own goods and services to escape from what they see are the unfair trade relations with the developed world. George Monbiot claims this idea does not recognise the fact that, even if developing countries often get a raw deal in trade relations, refusing to trade at all would be a significant blow, as the countries need the revenue generated by trade.

Some localists are also against immigration from poor countries to rich ones. One of the problems they claim results from such immigration is the drain on the intellectual resources of poor countries, so called brain drain. For example, in the past decade, Bulgaria is estimated to have lost more than 50,000 qualified scientists and skilled workers through emigration every year. About a fifth of them were highly educated specialists in chemistry, biology, medicine and physics.

== Localist activism ==
Localism usually describes social measures or trends which emphasise or value local and small-scale phenomena. This is in contrast to large, all-encompassing frameworks for action or belief. Localism can therefore be contrasted with globalisation, and in some cases localist activism has parallels with opposition to corporate-led globalization. Localism can be geographical, but there are also transnational linkages. Localist movements are often organized in support of locally owned, independent businesses and nonprofit organizations. Although the focus of this aspect of localist activism is on "buy local," "support local food," and "bank local" campaigns, some organizations and businesses also combine the goal of increased local ownership with environmental sustainability and social fairness goals.

Examples of localism are:

- Support for local food networks, such as farmers' markets, community-supported agriculture, community gardens, farm-to-table programs, food cooperatives, and restaurants that serve local food. The slow food movement, using diverse, seasonal, natural food in reaction to multinational merchandising of food which is uniform, produced using industrial methods, and called fast food.
- Support for locally family businesses, small craftsmans and farmers, traditional and local communities of small owners (craft guilds, farming circles and other), community banks and credit unions, such as the following organizations: American Independent Business Alliance, Business Alliance for Local Living Economies, the Institute for Local Self-Reliance, and Move Your Money. "The Benefits of Doing Business Locally" an essay by Jeff Milchen, American Independent Business Alliance co-founder, covers many arguments for local business ownership and patronage.
- Localism in media to support a diverse news media in the face of increasing corporate control. The US Federal Communications Commission made use of this term when seeking input on its rules, stating "promoting localism is a key goal of the Commission’s media ownership rules."
- Localism in government structures, which can include:
  - Tertiary government where small community councils make relevant decisions, with some degree of independence from local or national government.
  - Workers' councils, where the employees of a particular workplace discuss and negotiate with their employer, rather have this done by a national union which may be remote from local issues.
  - Federalism and devolution.
- Religion (Protestant):
  - Exclusive localism holds that there can't be more than one legitimate institutionally visible church at one given location, the variation of which varies but is usually held to be either a city or a neighbourhood.
  - Localism is more generally the congregationalist idea that each local church should be autonomous, only extended to reject any formal association of churches. It is specially relevant among Baptists, where localists reject the forming of Conventions.
- Religion (Churches of Christ):
  - The congregationalist idea of local autonomy is a cornerstone of restoration movement fellowships that identify as churches of Christ or Independent Christian Churches/Churches of Christ. Founders of the movement declared their independence from various denominations, seeking a fresh start to restore the New Testament church, and abandoning creeds. The names "Church of Christ," "Christian Church" and "Disciples of Christ" were adopted by the movement because they believed these terms to be biblical and not man made.
  - A converging of Christians across denominational lines in search of a return to a hypothesized original, "pre-denominational" Christianity. Participants in this movement sought to base doctrine and practice on the Bible alone, rather than recognizing the traditional councils and denominational hierarchies that had come to define Christianity since the 1st century. Members of the Churches of Christ believe that Jesus founded only one church, that the current divisions between Christians are not God's will, and that the only basis for restoring Christian unity is the Bible. They typically prefer to be known simply as "Christians", without any further religious or denominational identification. They see themselves as recreating the New Testament church established by Christ.
- Churches of Christ generally share these theological beliefs:
  - Refusal to hold to any formalized creeds or statements of faith, preferring instead a reliance on the Bible alone for doctrine and practice;
  - Autonomous, congregational church organization without denominational oversight;
  - Local governance by a plurality of male elders;
  - One of the largest divisions within churches of Christ was due to controversy of foreign missionary work. Opponents of what they dubbed "Institutionalism" argued against it both as a drain on local congregations and as sinful if done in cooperation with other congregations. This belief extended to cooperative support of orphanages, homes, large-scale radio and TV programs and ministries.
  - The Restoration Movement is so averse to association with other congregations that they renounce the term "protestant" distancing their churches from any association to any denomination; even one they would have to "protest" and evolve from.

== See also ==
- Communitarianism
- Atomization
- Accountable autonomy
- Agrarianism
- Autonomism (political doctrine)
- Autonomist Marxism
- Communalism
- Decentralisation
- Distributed manufacturing
- Distributism
- Global justice
- Glocalization
- Indigenism
- Internationalization and localization
- Irredentism
- Knowledge transfer
- List of micro-regional organizations
- Local ethnic nationalism (China)
- Localism Act 2011
- Localism in Thailand
- Localism in Hong Kong
- Nationalism
- Nativism (politics)
- New localism
- Open Source Ecology (OSE)
- Parochialism
- Political unitarism
- Posse Comitatus (organization)
- Secession
- Self-determination
- Think globally, act locally
- Tribalism

== Sources ==
- Berry, Wendell (1977). The Unsettling of America: Culture and Agriculture. Sierra Club Books. ISBN 9780871561947.
- Sale, Kirkpatrick (1980). Human Scale. Coward, McCann & Geoghegan. ISBN 9781603587129.
- Schumacher, Ernst F. (2011). Small Is Beautiful: Economics as if People Mattered. London: Vintage. ISBN 9780099225614.
- Katz, Bruce; Nowak, Jeremy (2018). The New Localism: How Cities Can Thrive in the Age of Populism. Brookings Institution Press. ISBN 9780815731641.
- McKibben, Bill (2010). Eaarth (1st ed.). New York: Time Books / Henry Holt. ISBN 9780805091861.
- Curtis, Fred (2003). "Eco-localism and Sustainability". Ecological Economics. 46 (1): 83–102. Bibcode:2003EcoEc..46...83C. doi:10.1016/S0921-8009(03)00102-2.
- Pugh, Michael (30 June 2014). "Centralism versus localism? Democracy versus efficiency? The perennial challenges of Scottish local government organisation". History & Policy.
- O’Neill, Tip; Hymel, Gary (1994). All Politics Is Local, and Other Rules of the Game (1st ed.). New York: Times Books.
