= Network of Associations of Local Authorities of South-East Europe =

The Network of Associations of Local Authorities of South-East Europe or (NALAS) was created in 2001 to enhance the process of democratization and decentralization in south-east Europe. It is currently made up of national associations of local authorities in the region.

== About ==
The Network of Associations of Local Authorities of South East Europe (NALAS) was established in 2001 under the auspices of the Stability Pact and the Council of Europe. Today, it gathers 14 national or regional local government associations who represent more than 8000 local governments directly elected by around 80 million people. NALAS builds partnerships in order to contribute to the reconciliation and stabilisation process in the region and henceforth contributes to the process of the European integration of the whole region, as well as regional development.

== Background ==
In May 2001, the Congress of Local and Regional Authorities of the Council of Europe began using voluntary donations from the Swiss Government under the Stability Pact to help create this network now known of NALAS to help strengthen local democracy.

In December 2002, the Congress hosted the network’s first conference in Strasbourg, and, after 18 months’ work, the NALAS statutes were signed in the Council of Europe’s Assembly Chamber during the Plenary Session of the Congress on 27 May 2004.

The first General Assembly of the Association was held in Skopje on 6 September 2005. NALAS is no longer an informal network but rather an association with an official status and an infrastructure which should enable it to become more independent. It can now establish links with international and European organizations and with other associations in the same field and set up specific projects and activity programmes.

== Objectives ==
NALAS promotes the process of decentralisation in cooperation with central governments and international organisations, considering local self-government as a key issue in the current process of transition affecting the various countries in South-East Europe. NALAS builds partnerships in order to contribute to the reconciliation and stabilisation process in the region and henceforth contributes to the process of the European integration of the whole region.

NALAS initiates and carries out regional initiatives for its members and helps the associations to become viable representatives of local authorities vis-à-vis central government. NALAS aims to provide services to local governments for the benefit of the citizens in the region and wishes to develop itself as the knowledge centre for local government development in South-East Europe, recognised among all relevant stakeholders.

== Strategy ==
NALAS 2019-2019 Strategy focuses on four strategic objectives:

1. Sustainable Communities

Local Governments in SEE have capacity to create sustainable communities based on smart and innovative growth through quality services and job creation.

2. Stable and Resilient Communities

Decentralised cooperation contributes to stable, safe, inclusive and resilient SEE communities and regional cohesion.

3. Improved Services

SEE Local Government Associations and Local Governments emerging needs are met by a unique knowledge and evidence based policy making and influence, through strategic regional and national partnerships.

4. Sustainability of the network

Networks’ sustainability is ensured by using all NALAS potentials.

== Activities ==
In line with its action plan, the NALAS Secretariat organises advisory concilium and task forces on specific themes important to local government in South-East Europe. NALAS focuses primarily on local finances, urban planning, solid waste and water management, sustainable tourism, institutional development and energy efficiency. They bring together the best experts from the region, competent association staff and professionals employed in the local government administration. These practitioners are most typically heading a local government department and are exposed in the front lines directly facing the consequences and challenges coming from policies and laws which define the system of local government. The task forces on each of these topics develop different projects and activities.

== NALAS Services ==
1. NALAS Quick Response service is an exclusive service tailored for the needs of NALAS member Local Government Associations. The Quick Response service is specialised in regional ad-hoc information collection and analysis, used by the member Associations in dealing with important policy issues or otherwise negotiating with their respective central governments.

2. The Peer Review is a service designed to facilitate a process of learning from the experience of other NALAS member LGAs on the topic of importance for the member LGA that requests the service (Host Association).

NALAS member LGAs are given a closer look at the Host Association operations and quickly understand key challenges it faces through presentations and meetings with the LGA key staff and external stakeholders. The Peer Reviewers provide advices for future development of the Host Association, drawing from their own perspective and experience. This serves for mutual learning through better understanding of NALAS members and developing joint benchmarks for good performance.

3. NALAS e-Academy is an online platform for development learning designed for local governments of South-East Europe. NALAS e-Academy provides a superb knowledge on topics relevant for local government professionals in the areas of urban planning, energy efficiency, municipal finance, water management, solid waste management and more. Taking advantage of new technologies, the learning experience provided by the NALAS e-Academy is affordable, innovative and practitioner-focused.

== Members ==
NALAS currently is a network of associations covering more than 4,000 local authorities who have been directly elected by over 60 million citizens in south-east Europe. It is made up of full members (national associations of local authorities from south-east Europe) and associate members (associations of local authorities from countries outside south-east Europe, international associations of local authorities, bodies working in the same areas as local authorities, foundations, international and European organizations, non-governmental organizations and donors), as well as honorary members.

=== List of members ===
Country/Region	English name	Local name
Albania	Association of Local Authorities of Albanian	Shoqata për Autonomi Vendore
Bosnia and Herzegovina	Association of Municipalities and Cities of the Federation of BiH; Association of Municipalities and Cities of Republika Srpska	Savez općina i gradova Federacije Bosne i Hercegovine; Savez opština i gradova Republike Srpske
Bulgaria	National Association of Municipalities in the Republic of Bulgaria	Националното сдружение на общините в Република България (НСОРБ)
Croatia	Association of Municipalities of the Republic of Croatia	Udruga općina u Republici Hrvatskoj
Slovenia	Association of Municipalities and Towns of Slovenia	Skupnost občin Slovenije
Kosovo	Association of Kosovo Municipalities	Asociacioni i Komunave të Kosovës
Republic of Moldova	Congress of Local Authorities from Moldova	Congresul Autorităţilor Locale din Moldova
Montenegro	Union of Municipalities of Montenegro	Zajednica Opština Crne Gore
North Macedonia	Association of the Units of Local Self-government of North Macedonia	Заедниза на единиците на локалната самоуправа
Romania	Association of Communes of Romania	Asociația Comunelor din România
Serbia	Standing Conference of Towns and Municipalities	Stalna konferencija gradova i opština – Savez gradova i opština Srbije
Turkey	Union of Municipalities of Marmara	Marmara Belediyer Birligi

== Executive director of NALAS Secretariat ==
Kelmend Zajazi

== NALAS President ==
NALAS President for the period 2018-2019 is Mr. Darko Fras, Mayor of Sveta Trojica v Slovenskih Goricah in Slovenia and member of the Board of the Slovenian Association of Towns and Municipalities.

== NALAS Vice Presidents ==
Current NALAS Vice-Presidents are: Mr. Petre Shilegov, Mayor of the City of Skopje, North Macedonia and President of the Association of Self-Government Units in North Macedonia (ZELS)., Mrs. Tatiana Badan the President of the Congress of Local Authorities from Moldova (CALM) and Mayor of Selemet Municipality from Cimislia District of the Republic of Moldova and Mr. Emanuil Manolov, Mayor of Pavlikeni Municipality in Bulgaria.

== Former NALAS Presidents ==
Mr. Mićo Mićić (2017-2018)

Mr. Naim Ismajli (2016-2017),

Mr. Emil Draghici (2015-2016),

Mr. Djuro Bukvic (2014-2015),

Mr. Anton Peršak (2013-2014),

Mr. Ozgen Keskin (2012-2013),

Mr. Vladimir Moskov (2009-2012),

Mr. Tarzan Milosevic (2005-2009) and

Mr. Goran Angelov.

== Sources ==
- Council of Europe on NALAS
- NALAS Website
