= Croatian Union of Municipalities =

Non-governmental organization in Croatia

- Hrvatska Zajednica općina
- Abbreviation: HZO
- Formation: June 19, 2002
- Type: Non-profit organization founded on the principle of voluntary association
- Legal status: active
- Purpose: promotion and protection a common interests of Croatian municipalities
- Headquarters: Zagreb
- Location: Ulica grada Vukovara 21
- Region served: Croatia
- Members: 327 municipalities
- Official language: Croatian
- President: Martin Baričević
- Main organ: Management board
- Website: https://hzo.hr/

Croatian Union of Municipalities (Croatian: Hrvatska Zajednica Općina) is a non-profit, non-governmental and non-partisan organization founded on the principle of voluntary association. It was established by the Croatian municipalities with the purpose to promote and protect their common interests. In 2021 Association of Municipalities counts 327 (from total of 428) municipalities from across all 20 Croatian counties.

== Institutional background ==
The association was established on June 19, 2002, in Zagreb, based on the Law on Associations and Law on Local and Regional Self-Government. Croatian municipalities have been members of the Association of Towns and Municipalities from 1975 to 2002 until there was a dissolution of the organization and three separate Local government associations were created: The Association of Municipalities, The Association of Towns and The Croatian County Association. From 2012 to 2015 there was The Coordination of The Local Government (KOLOS) constituted of The Association of Municipalities and The Association of Towns. In March 2019 association changes its name to Croatian Union of Municipalities.

Presidents of The Association of Municipalities:

- Ivo Emić (2002–2007)
- Ivica Klem (2007–2009)
- Đuro Bukvić (2009–2017)
- Martin Baričević (2017–present)

== Governing bodies and activities of the Association of Municipalities ==
Governing bodies defined by the Statute of the Association of Municipalities:

- President and three Vice-presidents
- Secretary General
- Assembly (member representatives)
- Management board (20 members – one from each county)
- Presidency (five members)

Key activities of the association include: promotion of cooperation and sharing of experiences between Croatian municipalities; promotion of special features in economic, cultural and other spheres of municipal life; legal review of legislation relevant for local self-government; facilitation of professional training for local officials and employees; organization of thematic conferences and meetings relevant to municipalities and their interests; advocacy of municipal interests in front of central government bodies and other institutions; assisting members to establish cooperation with municipalities outside Croatia; cooperation with like organizations at home as well as abroad, as well as with organizations which mandates contribute to key goals and principles of the association; regular information sharing with its members and various publishing and printing activities.

== Local self-governance in the Republic of Croatia ==
The right to local and regional self-government is guaranteed by the Croatian Constitution. Croatian system of local self-government is based on the principle of autonomy of government and the principle of subsidiarity. Croatia has 21 units of regional self-government, which consist of 20 counties with the city of Zagreb, 127 towns (without Zagreb) and 428 municipalities. Each municipality, city and county have their own representative body. Croatian municipalities are currently in a process of depopulation which is becoming a serious problem. Just in the last ten years they have lost 80,285 inhabitants.

== International cooperation ==
Cooperation between municipalities, cities and counties with local and regional governments in other countries is regulated by the Law on Local and Regional self-government. Cooperation with appropriate local and regional governments of other countries is established and developed within their self-governing jurisdiction, in accordance with the law and international treaties. The decision on establishing mutual cooperation, and the conclusion of agreements is made by the council, representative body of the local government. The Association of Municipalities in the Republic of Croatia is a member of NALAS (Network of Associations of Local Authorities of South East Europe). The Network brings together 16 Associations which represent roughly 9,000 local authorities, directly elected by more than 80 million citizens of this region.

== Interesting facts ==
About 30% of the Croatian population live in the municipalities and the average number of inhabitants in the Croatian municipalities is slightly less than 3 000. The smallest municipality is Civljane (239 inhabitants) and the largest Viškovo with 14,445 inhabitants. The northernmost municipality is Sveti Martin na Muri, the easternmost is Lovas, Konavle is the southernmost and the westernmost is Brtonigla. The highest municipality is Mrkopalj (1,070 m). The smallest municipality is Dekanovec (6.1 km2).

The Split-Dalmatian County has the biggest number of municipalities (39), and the Požega-Slavonia County has the smallest number (5).

The longest village is Velika Pisanica in the municipality of Velika Pisanica (13 km).

The municipality of Hrašćina in Krapina-Zagorje County is known for its meteorite fall in May 1751: it was the first detailed and officially documented fall of an extraterrestrial matter in the world and is considered to be the beginning of scientific astronomy in this part of Europe.

== See also ==
- Joint Council of Municipalities
