= Mićo Mićić =

Bosnian Serb politician (1956–2020)

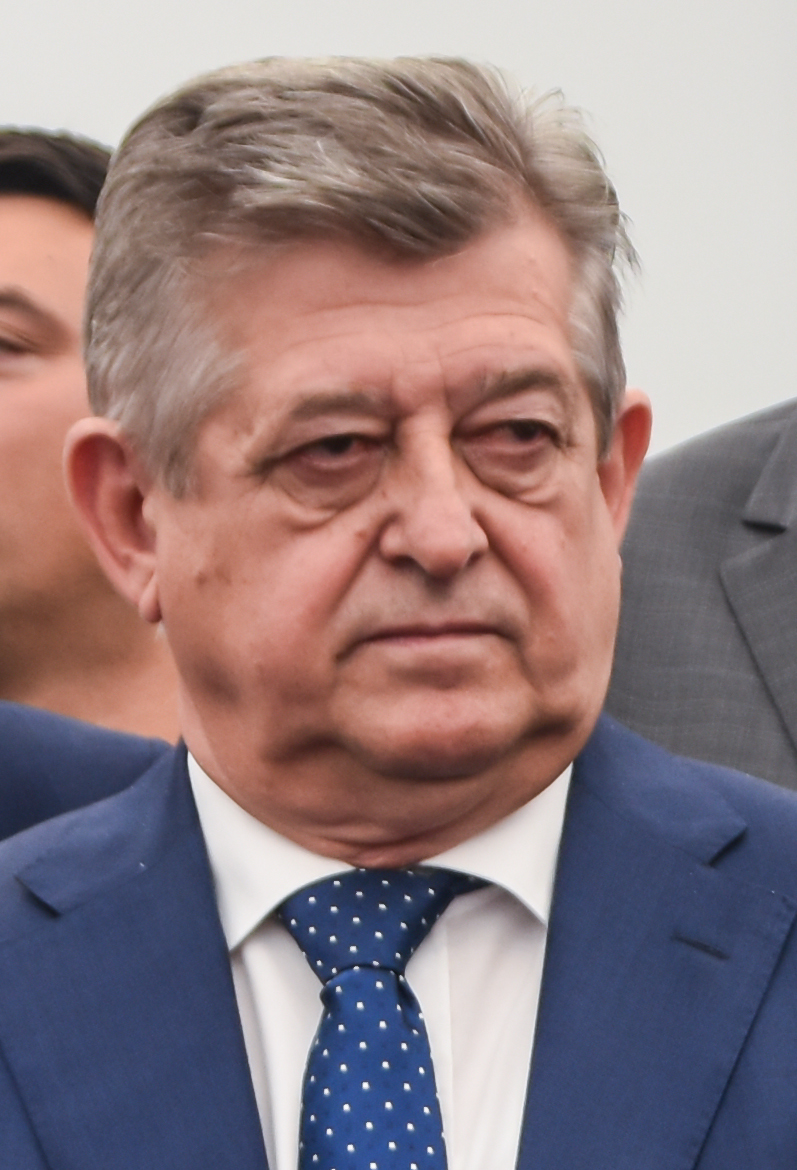

Mayor of Bijeljina
- In office 2 October 2004 – 23 December 2020
- Succeeded by: Ljubiša Petrović

Personal details
- Born: 6 September 1956 Bijeljina, PR Bosnia and Herzegovina, FPR Yugoslavia
- Died: 23 December 2020 (aged 64) Banja Luka, Bosnia and Herzegovina
- Party: Party of Democratic Srpska Semberija (2020)
- Other political affiliations: Serb Democratic Party (until 2020)
- Spouse: Radmila Mićić
- Children: 3
- Profession: Politician

Mićo Mićić (6 September 1956 – 23 December 2020) was a Bosnian Serb politician, mayor of Bijeljina for 16 years from 2004 until 2020 and a Republika Srpska entity minister.

== Political career ==
Mićić finished primary and secondary technical school in Bijeljina, and then the Faculty of Physical Education in 1981 in Sarajevo. In the period from 1981 to 1992, Mićić worked as a teacher at the high school center in Kalesija, and from 1992 to 1996 as a teacher at the Technical School "Mihajlo Pupin" in Bijeljina.

From 1996 to 2000, Mićić was the head of the Department for Veterans' and Disabled Issues in the Administrative Service of the Municipality of Bijeljina.

After the 2000 parliamentary elections, Mićić was appointed Minister for refugees and displaced persons in the Government of the Republika Srpska. From 2003 to 2005, he served as Minister of Labor and Veterans' and Disabled Protection. He also served as vice president of the Serb Democratic Party (SDS).

In the local elections in October 2004, Mićić was elected mayor of Bijeljina, re-elected in 2008, 2012 and 2016. In 2013, the mayors and mayors of the municipalities and cities of the Republika Srpska elected Mićić as President of the Association of Municipalities and Cities of the Republika Srpska, and since 2017 he has been vice president of the Association. In 2017-2018 he also served as first chairman of the Network of Associations of Local Authorities of South-East Europe (NALAS).

In March 2020, Mićić was expelled from the SDS because of alleged pre-electoral negotiations with Milorad Dodik; he went on to found the Party of Democratic Srpska Semberija (SDSS), with which he was re-appointed as candidate for mayor of Bijeljina in coalition with Dodik's ruling SNSD party. At the 15 November municipal elections Mićić unexpectedly lost the re-election in favour of the opposition candidate Ljubiša Petrović (SDS).

== Personal life ==
On 26 November 2020, Mićić tested positive for COVID-19 during the COVID-19 pandemic in Bosnia and Herzegovina and was taken to the University Hospital of Banja Luka, where he was intubated on 2 December 2020. He died there three weeks later, on 23 December.

He was married and was the father of three children. Mićić was a holder of the Order of Saint Sava I and II order awarded by the Holy Synod of Bishops of the Serbian Orthodox Church.
