= Tertiary government =

Tertiary government usually refers to the local or lowest organizational level of government within three-layered federal systems. Typical federal systems include:

1. the principal national government;
2. the secondary provinces, states or departments; and,
3. the tertiary municipalities, counties or townships.

This generalization glosses over "microregional" organizations of greater cities and associations of counties or municipalities. It also does not take into account intergovernmental or supranational levels of governance, such as the European Union, the United Nations, or the World Trade Organization for example.

Hospitals may sometimes be categorised as tertiary level. Tertiary government hospitals exist in the Philippines.

== See also ==
- Localism
- List of micro-regional organizations
