= Werfenweng =

- Municipality
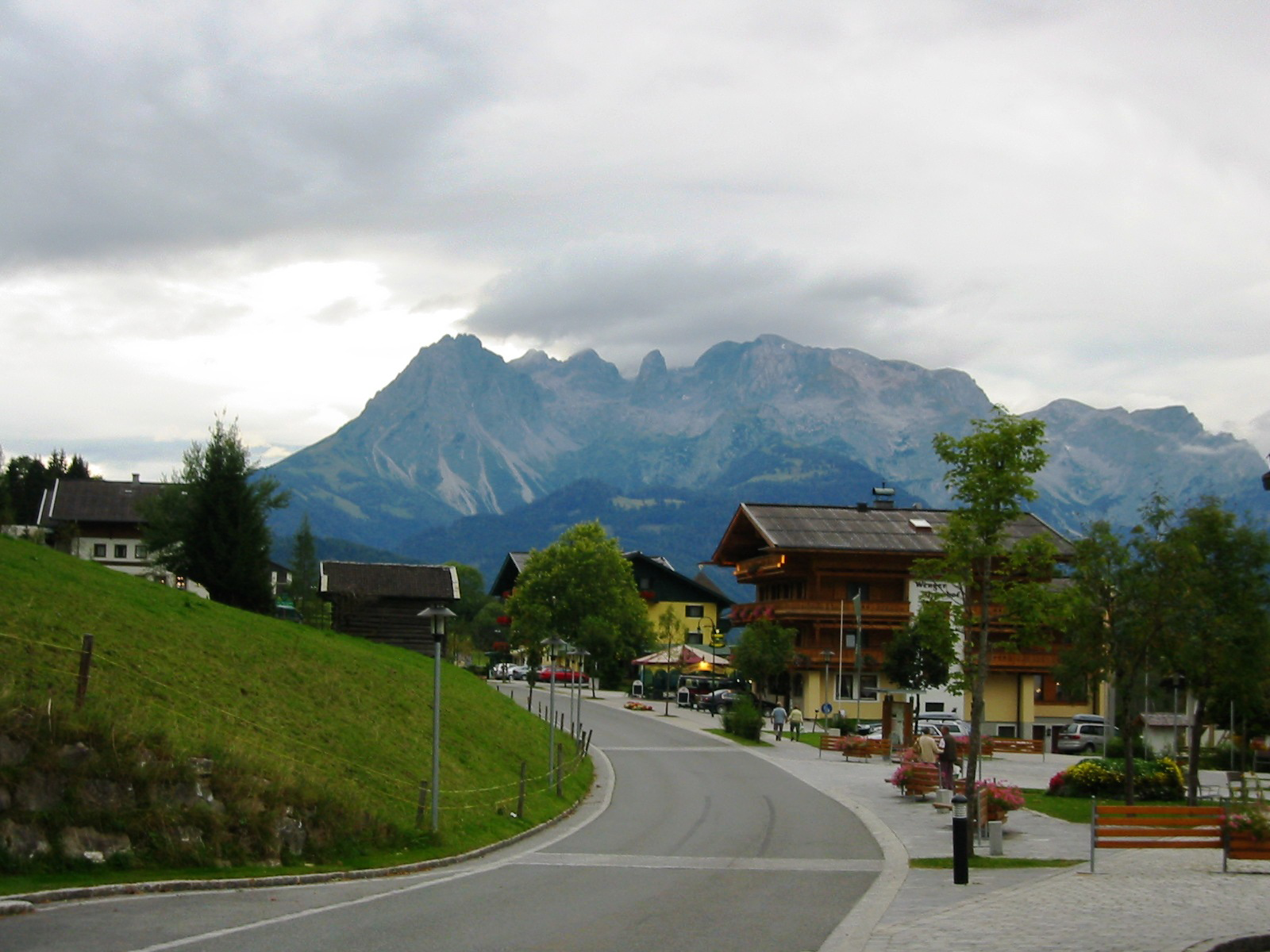
- View of Werfenweng

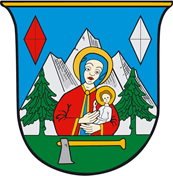
- Coat of arms

- Location within Austria
- Coordinates: 47°27′40″N 13°15′30″E
- Country: Austria
- State: Salzburg
- District: St. Johann im Pongau

Government
  - Mayor: Peter Brandauer (ÖVP)

Area
  - Total: 45.04 km^{2} (17.39 sq mi)
- Elevation: 902 m (2,959 ft)

Population (2018-01-01)
  - Total: 1,012
  - Density: 22.47/km^{2} (58.19/sq mi)
- Time zone: UTC+1 (CET)
  - Summer (DST): UTC+2 (CEST)
- Postal code: 5453
- Area code: 06466
- Vehicle registration: JO
- Website: www.gemeinde-werfenweng.at

Werfenweng is a municipality in the St. Johann im Pongau district in the state of Salzburg in Austria.

== Population ==
Historical population
Year	Pop.	±%
1961	417	—
1971	504	+20.9%
1981	526	+4.4%
1991	615	+16.9%
2001	766	+24.6%
2006	819	+6.9%

== Politics ==
The mayor is Dr. Peter Brandauer from the Austrian People's Party.

== See also ==
- Alpine pearls
- Salzburgerland
- Salzburg
