= Municipal Alliance for Peace =

The Municipal Alliance for Peace (MAP) is a network which exists to promote peace in the Middle East. It was set up in June 2005, at a conference in The Hague, to encourage municipal cooperation between Palestinian and Israeli local authorities through joint initiatives of the Association of Palestinian Local Authorities (APLA) and the Union of Local Authorities of Israel (ULAI). The MAP seeks to involve municipalities in other countries to cooperate in these joint projects.

At the first World Conference on City Diplomacy, in The Hague in June 2008, a detailed presentation of MAP was given as a case study in this type of cooperation.

The Alliance secretariat has an office in Jerusalem. It issues a regular newsletter.

== Board composition ==
It is run by a Board, composed of the following members:

- Association of Palestinian Local Authorities (APLA)
- Union of Local Authorities of Israel (ULAI)
- UNDP Programme of Assistance to the Palestinian People (UNDP/PAPP)
- United Cities and Local Governments (UCLG)
- Federation of Canadian Municipalities (FCM)
- European Network of Local Authorities for Peace in the Middle East (ELPME)
- City of Hamar
- City of Rome
- City of Barcelona
- City of Cologne
