= Association of Netherlands Municipalities =

Dutch organization

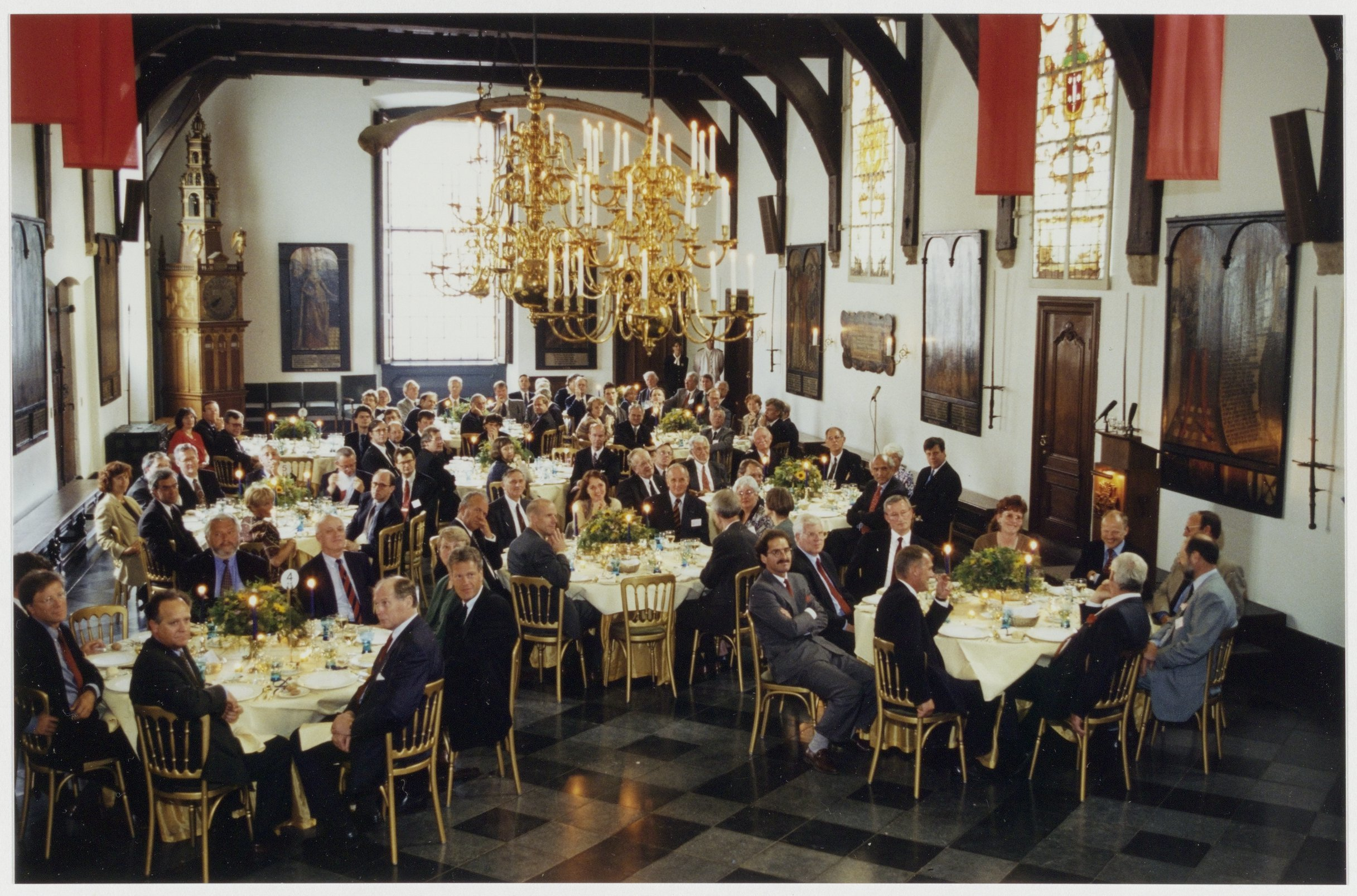
1995 VNG meeting at Haarlem City Hall

The Association of Netherlands Municipalities (Dutch: Vereniging van Nederlandse Gemeenten or VNG) was established in 1912 by 28 Dutch cities, at a time when the number of tasks delegated to municipalities saw a rapid increase. As a result of this increase, there was a greater need for information, exchange of experiences, as well as for an organisation that could represent the interests of its members at a central government level.

The Association of Dutch Municipalities is located in The Hague and it represents the interests of all 342 Dutch municipalities vis-a-vis the national government. In addition it delivers services to all Dutch municipalities. Also the Caribbean constituent countries Aruba, Curaçao and Sint Maarten, as well as the Caribbean public bodies Bonaire, Sint Eustatius and Saba are members of the organisation. The current president of the board is The Hague Mayor Jan van Zanen.

Its Organisation for International Co-operation, VNG International, seeks to strengthen democratic local government in the world and implements projects in more than 40 countries in Europe, Asia, Africa and Latin America.

== See also ==
- List of micro-regional organizations
