= Monte Zebrù =

Mountain in Italy

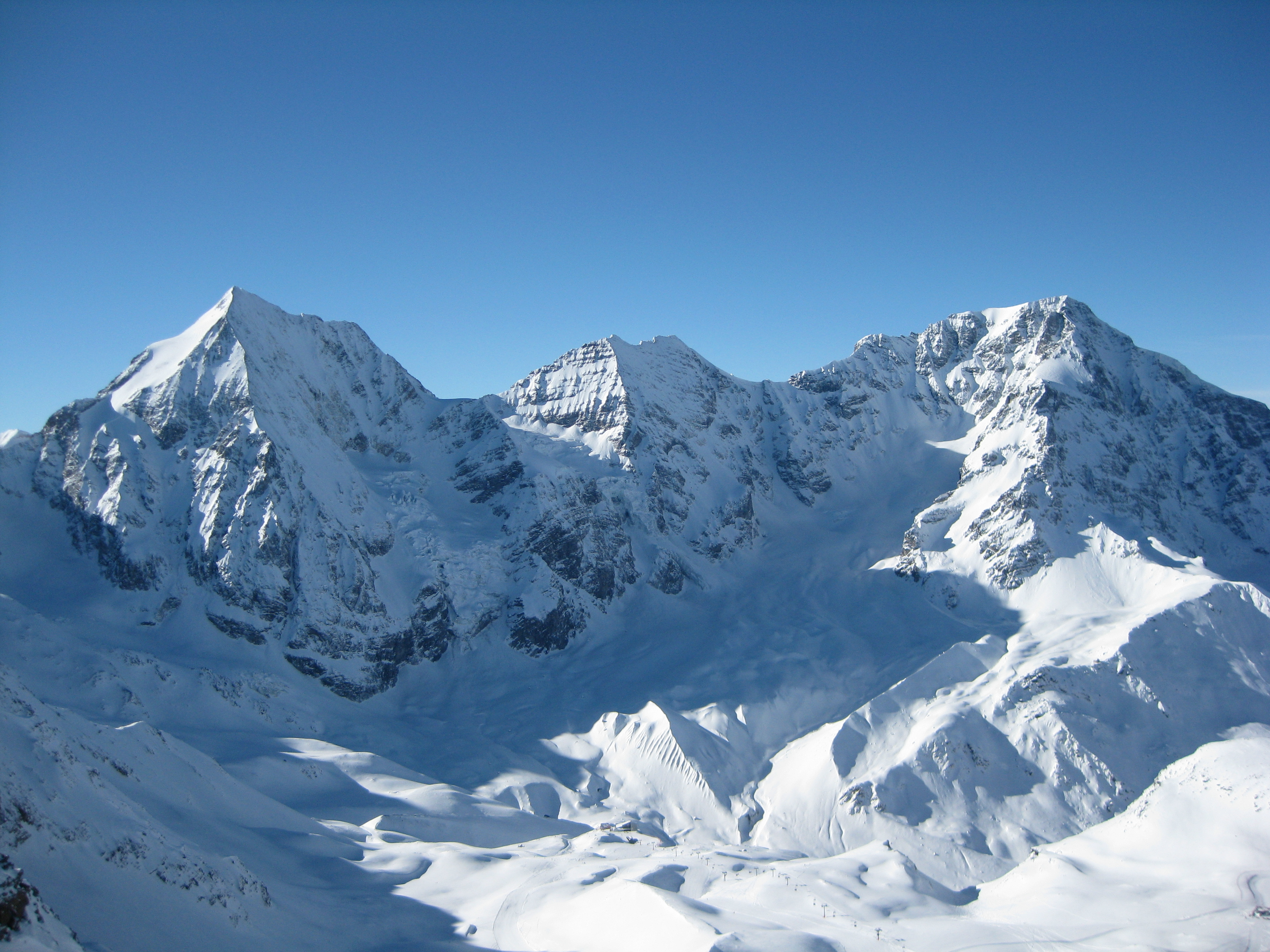
- The Monte Zebrù between the Königspitze (left) and the Ortler (right)

Highest point
- Elevation: 3,735 m (12,254 ft)
- Coordinates: 46°29′36″N 10°32′53″E

Geography
- Location within Alps
- Location: Lombardy, Italy
- Parent range: Ortler Alps

Monte Zebrù (Italian pronunciation: [ˈmonte ddzeˈbru]) is a mountain of the Ortler Alps between Lombardy and South Tyrol, Italy.
