= Alpine Pearls =

Tourism agency in Europe

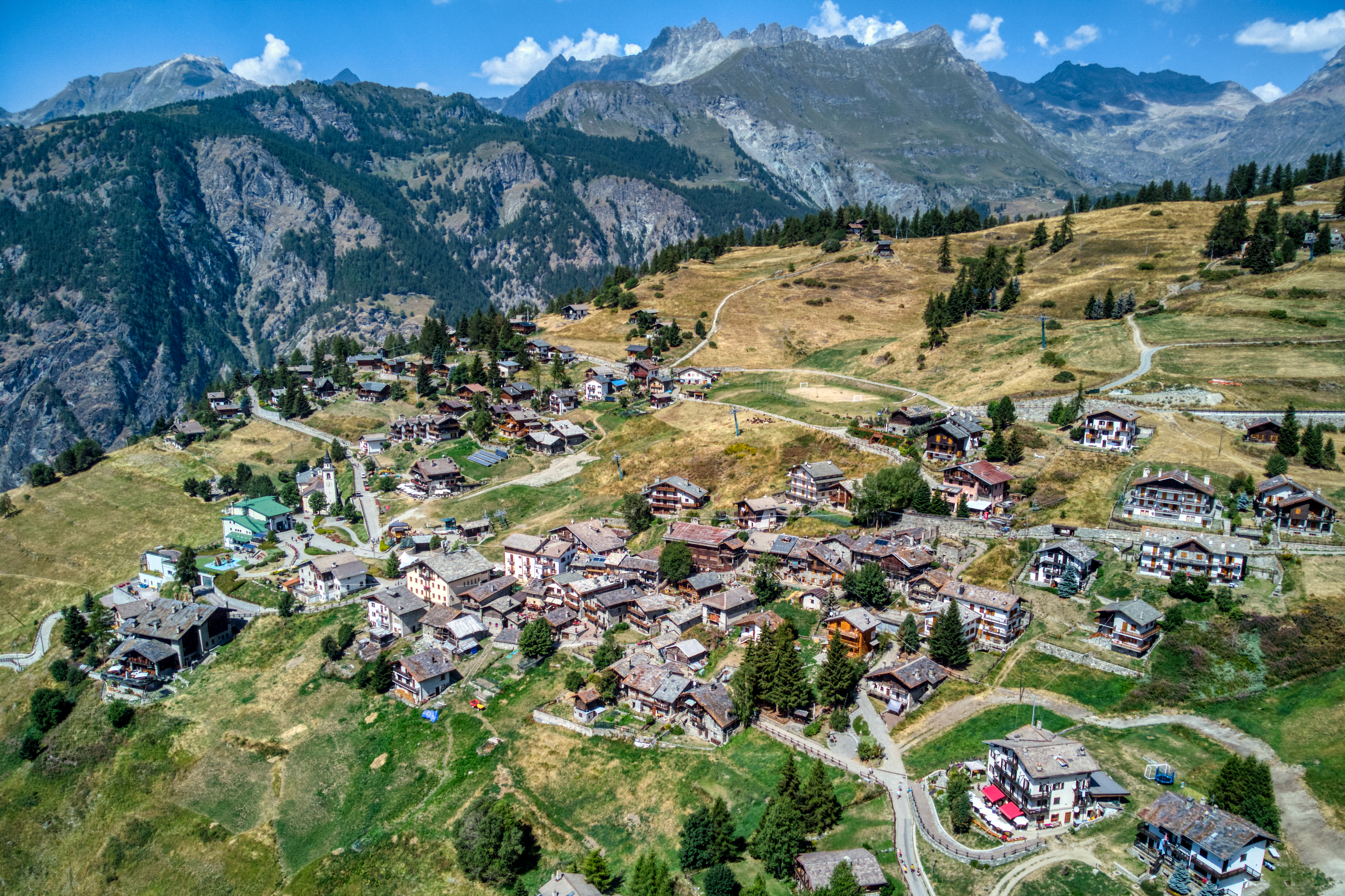
Chamois, Aosta Valley

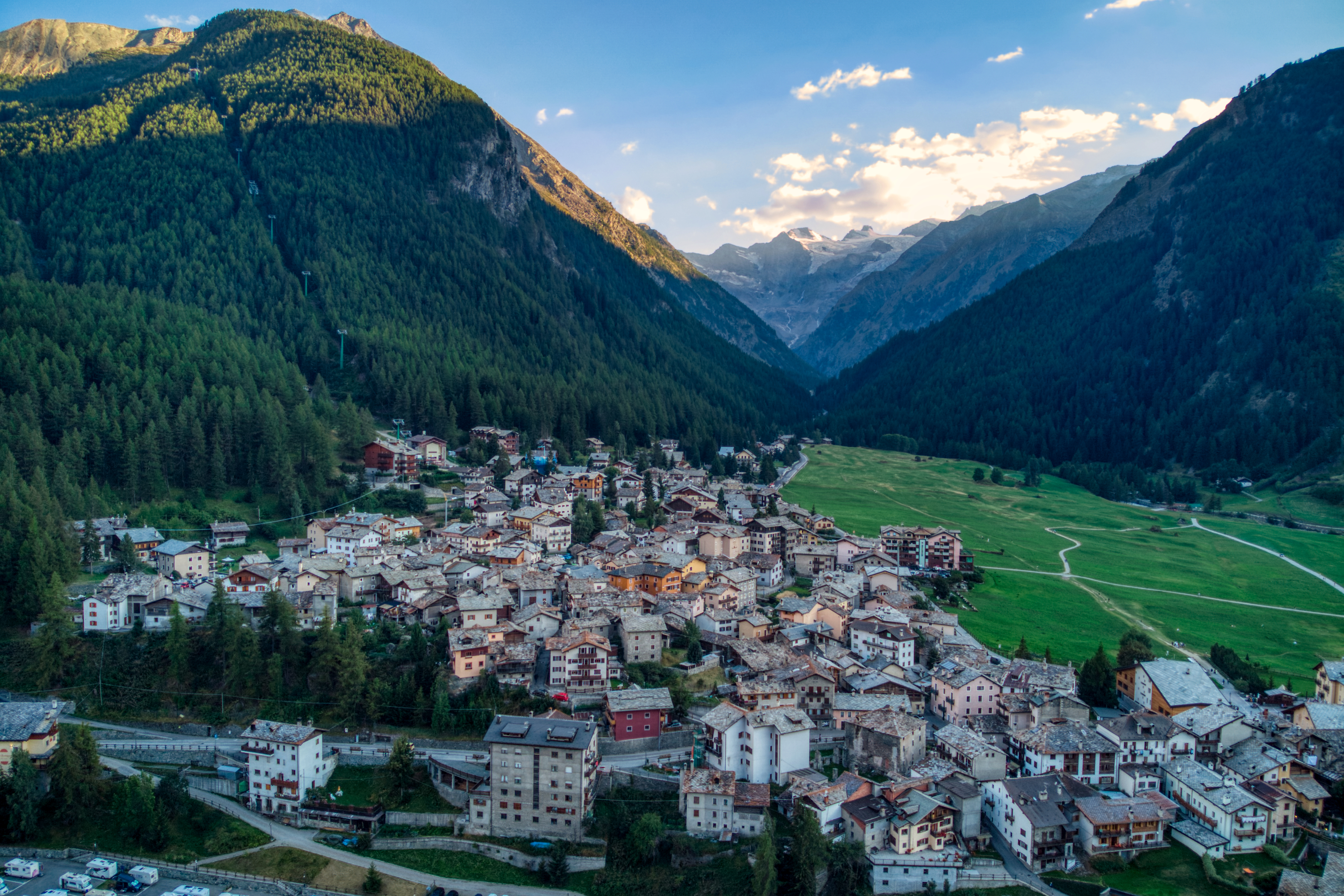
Cogne, Aosta Valley

Alpine Pearls is a cooperative established in 2006, consisting of 23 municipalities in five alpine countries. The tourism association claims to support and promote active mobility. The cooperation’s members fulfill strict quality criteria like town centers with reduced traffic, transfer services, environmentally friendly leisure time facilities, the guarantee of mobility without a car, and ecological minimum standards.

== History ==
Alpine Pearls was established in 2006. It is the result of two successive EU projects (Alps Mobility and Alps Mobility II – Alpine Pearls). The cooperation emphasizes the importance of sustainable tourism, combining tourist attractions with environmentally friendly active mobility. The association encourages tourists to visit less popular places. The scholar Sarah Seidel said this relieves the burden on the crowded, popular places and allows inhabitants of the less popular places to benefit from those tourists' money.

== Member municipalities ==
=== Germany ===
- Bad Reichenhall
- Berchtesgaden

=== Italy ===
- Ceresole Reale
- Cogne
- Chamois - La Magdeleine
- Forni di Sopra
- Moena
- Moos in Passeier
- Mals
- Ratschings
- Villnöß
- Limone Piemonte

=== Austria ===
- Hinterstoder
- Mallnitz
- Neukirchen am Großvenediger
- Weissensee
- Werfenweng

=== Switzerland ===
- Arosa
- Interlaken
- Disentis / Mustér
- Les Diablerets

=== Slovenia ===
- Bled
- Bohinj

== Bibliography ==
- Nadegger, Monica; Dobusch, Leonhard (2022). "Meta-organisations as drivers for sustainability across tourism clusters in the Alps: A case study of 'Alpine Pearls'". In Lupova-Henry, Evgeniya; Dotti, Nicola Francesco (eds.). Clusters and Sustainable Regional Development: A Meta-Organisational Approach. Abingdon, Oxon: Routledge. pp. 160–175. doi:10.4324/9781003215066-14. ISBN 978-1-00-321506-6 – via Google Books.
