= Association of Municipalities and Towns of Slovenia =

Association of Municipalities and Towns of Slovenia (Slovene: Skupnost občin Slovenije) (SOS) was established in 1992 and is the biggest representative association of the municipalities of Slovenia. The association has 167 member municipalities (from 212 municipalities) and with this it covers nearly 90% of the inhabitants of Slovenia.

SOS is a member of the Network of Associations of Local Authorities of South-East Europe (NALAS)

== Organization ==
Because of different needs in association with community's size the association is organized in three sections – section of city municipalities, section with Administrative Unit headquarters and section of other communities. President of each section is also a vice-president of the Association. Member municipalities represent and accomplish their tasks in 11 work groups and commissions, as well as in 15 work groups of association (440 representatives of member communities are operating in this groups), in which they coordinate legal acts and regulation act within working areas that are important for the communities.

The highest executive body of association is the presidency, composed of 25 mayors, 7 from each section.

- President: Franc Kagler, mayor of the Municipality of Maribor
- Vice-president: Irena Majcen, mayor of the Municipality of Slovenska Bistrica
- Vice-president: Bojan Šrot, mayor of the Municipality of Celje
- Vice-president: Anton Peršak, mayor of the Municipality of Trzin

== Services for the members of the community ==
Tasks of Association of Municipalities and Towns of Slovenia are, in particular, implementation and representation of local community's common interests in proportion to coordination with legal and regulation acts, which, with their solutions, impact on municipalities’ situation. Among this, there are many other tasks, inter alia:

- They draw up and carry out different types of education for member communities
- It offers help and scientific advice to the member communities in those fields where it is necessary
- It gives effect and it represents common interests of the community towards the state authorities and international organizations
- It creates common development projects
- It represents community's interests in the negotiations for financial credits intended for the community's from state budget
- It represents community's interests in the procedures of making collective contract for public sector
- It prepares professional materials for the community's needs
- It takes care of member community's regular informing, about issues, that are important for the community's functioning

== See also ==
- Network of Associations of Local Authorities of South-East Europe
- Committee of the Regions
- Council of European Municipalities and Regions
