= Alabama Association of School Boards =

Non-profit organization representing school boards in Alabama

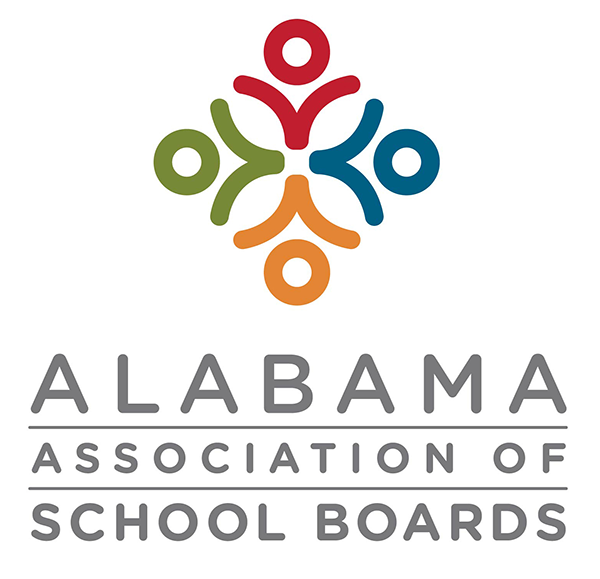
Alabama Association of School Boards logo

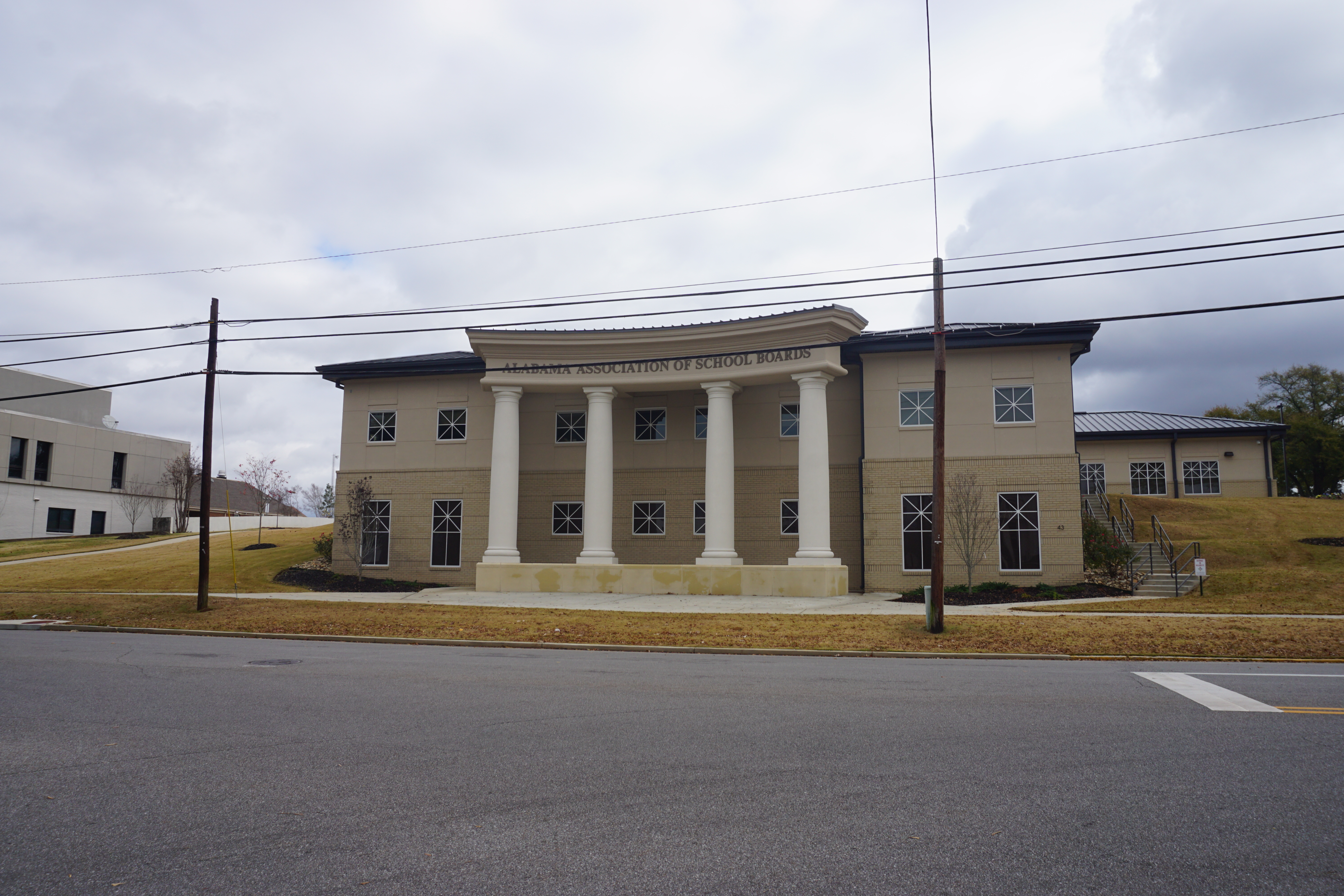
Alabama Association of School Boards building in Montgomery, Alabama

The Alabama Association of School Boards (AASB) is an Alabama non-profit organization that represents school boards across the state.

== History ==
AASB was organized as the Alabama Association of Members and Executive Officers of County and City School Boards in June 1949. The association was initially composed of 128 individuals from 40 county and 13 city school systems. By July 1949, the association's name was changed to the Alabama Association of School Board Members. AASB was the 39th state school board association formed in the US.

In 1950, the association approved its first constitution and bylaws. AASB moved its headquarters from Tuscaloosa to Montgomery in 1974.
