= League of Historical Cities =

International organization established in 1987

The League of Historical Cities
- Abbreviation: LHC
- Formation: 1987
- Type: Nonprofit organization
- Headquarters: Kyoto, Japan
- Board of directors: Xi'an, Konya, Ballarat, Gyeongju, Ljubljana, Bad Ischl, Shiraz
- Website: www.lhc-s.org
- Formerly called: World Conference of Historical Cities Council

The League of Historical Cities (LHC) was established in Kyoto, Japan in 1987. It holds a biennial world conference and connects cities from different parts of the world. The League also acts as a think tank for bilateral cooperation, mutual learning and best practices. It aims to strengthen affiliations between historic cities to exchange knowledge, deepen mutual understanding and build on the common foundations.

As of December 2014, the league was composed of 119 members from 66 countries and regions. It is in partnership with the United Nations Human Settlements Programme, International Council on Monuments and Sites and the Organization of World Heritage Cities.

The League consists of 71 historic cities from 50 different countries, and in 2008, it was joined by Gongju (Korea), Lviv and Odesa (Ukraine), Minsk (Belarus), and Osmangazi (Turkey).

The purpose of the LHC, according to its statutes, is to guarantee eternal peace for future generations, to deepen human understanding through cross-national education, and to support the development of historical cities through education with the aim of promoting human understanding across national borders. The 'League of Historical Cities' is an international organization dedicated to developing and carrying out projects on an international level that are in line with its established objectives.

== World Conference of Historical Cities ==
The league holds a biennial world conference.

1. Kyoto 1987 "Historical Cities in the 21st Century – Tradition and Creativity -"
2. Florence 1988 "Historical Cities in the Future of Mankind"
3. Barcelona 1991 "The Memories of and Futures of Cities"
4. Kyoto 1994 "In Quest of the Wisdom of Historical Cities"
5. Xi'an 1996 "Revival of Historical Cities"
6. Kraków 1998 "Heritage and Development of Historical Cities"
7. Montpellier 2000 "History of Value"
8. Montreal 2003 "Conserving and Developing – How? With whom? Why? –"
9. Gyeongju 2005 "Today and Tomorrow of the Historical Cities: Preservation and Restoration of the Historical Cities"
10. Ballarat 2006 "Sustainable Historical Cities: – Economics, Preservation and Visions for the Future –"
11. Konya 2008 "Living Cultural Heritage in Historical Cities"
12. Nara 2010 "Succession of Historical City with Creative Revitalization"
13. Huế 2012 "Defining Universal Heritage Challenges and Solutions"
14. Yangzhou 2014 "Historical Cities: Ancient Culture Integrated into Modern Civilization"
15. Bad Ischl 2016 "Smart, innovative, creative historical cities of the future"
16. Bursa 2018 "The Impact of Globalization on Culture and Way of Living"

== Member cities ==
=== Africa ===
- Alexandria
- Algiers
- Fez
- Giza
- Luxor
- Tunis

=== Asia ===
- Andong
- Buyeo County
- Chengdu
- Chiang Mai
- Dujiangyan
- Gongju
- Gyeongju
- Hanoi
- Harion
- Himeji
- Huế
- Kaesong
- Kamakura
- Kanazawa
- Kathmandu
- Kurunegala
- Kyoto
- Lahore
- Naha
- Nanjing
- Nara
- Suwon
- Taichung
- Tainan
- Ulaanbaatar
- Varanasi
- Vigan
- Vyas
- Wuxi
- Xi'an
- Yangon
- Yangzhou
- Yogyakarta
- Zhengzhou

=== Europe ===
- Alba Iulia
- Amsterdam
- Athens
- Bad Ischl
- Barcelona
- Bordeaux
- Bratislava
- Brussels
- Budapest
- Chernivtsi
- Cologne
- Constanta
- Corinth
- Córdoba
- Dublin
- Edinburgh
- Florence
- Geneva
- The Hague
- Helsingborg
- Iași
- Izhevsk
- Kazan
- Klaipėda
- Kraków
- Kutaisi
- Kyiv
- Lisbon
- Ljubljana
- Lutsk
- Lviv
- Minsk
- Montpellier
- Mtskheta
- Nicosia
- Niš
- Norwich
- Odesa
- Paris
- Prague
- Riga
- Rome
- Santiago de Compostela
- Sarajevo
- Shaki
- Shusha
- South East Region of Malta
- Strasbourg
- Tashkent
- Termez
- Veliko Tarnovo
- Venice
- Vienna
- Vladimir
- Zagreb

=== Latin America ===
- Cartagena
- Cuenca
- Cusco
- Guadalajara
- Mexico City

=== Middle East ===
- Ankara
- Ardabil
- Baghdad
- Bursa
- Hebron
- Isfahan
- Istanbul
- Jerusalem
- Kashan
- Kong
- Konya
- Masouleh
- Nayshabur
- Osmangazi
- Selcuklu
- Semnan
- Shiraz
- Tabriz

=== North America ===
- Boston
- Montreal
- Quebec City

=== Pacific ===
- Ballarat
- Melbourne
- Norwood Payneham & St Peters
- Whanganui
