= Hillforts in Britain =

Hillforts in Britain refers to the various hillforts within the island of Great Britain. Although the earliest such constructs fitting this description come from the Neolithic British Isles, with a few also dating to later Bronze Age Britain, British hillforts were primarily constructed during the British Iron Age. Some of these were apparently abandoned in the southern areas that were a part of Roman Britain, although at the same time, those areas of northern Britain that remained free from Roman occupation saw an increase in their construction. Some hillforts were reused in the Early Middle Ages, and in some rarer cases, into the later medieval period as well. By the early modern period, these had essentially all been abandoned, with many being excavated by archaeologists in the nineteenth century onward.

There are around 3,300 structures that can be classed as hillforts or similar defended enclosures within Britain. Most of these are clustered in certain regions: south and south-west England, the west coast of Wales and Scotland, the Welsh Marches and the Scottish border hills. British hillforts varied in size, with the majority covering an area of less than 1 hectare (2.5 acres), but with most others ranging from this up to around 12 hectares (30 acres) in size. In certain rare cases, they were bigger, with a few examples being over 80 hectares (200 acres) in size.

Various archaeologists operating in Britain have criticised the use of the term hillfort both because of its perceived connection to fortifications and warfare, and because not all such sites were actually located on hills. Leslie Alcock believed that the term enclosed places was more accurate. J. Forde-Johnston commented on his preference for defensive enclosures.

== Nomenclature ==
The spellings hill fort, hill-fort and hillfort are all used in the archaeological literature. The Monument Type Thesaurus published by the Forum on Information Standards in Heritage lists hillfort as the preferred term. They all refer to an elevated site with one or more ramparts made of earth, stone, or wood, with an external ditch. Many small early hillforts were abandoned, with the larger and greater ones being redeveloped at a later date. Some hillforts contain houses.

Similar but smaller and less defendable earthworks are found on the sides of hills. These are known as hill-slope enclosures and may have been animal pens.

== Historiography ==
Excavations at hillforts in the first half of the 20th century focussed on the defences, based on the assumption that hillforts were primarily developed for military purposes. The exception to this trend began in the 1930s with a series of excavations undertaken by Mortimer Wheeler at Maiden Castle, Dorset. From 1960 onwards, archaeologists shifted their attention to the interior of hillforts, re-examining their function. Currently, post-processual archaeologists regard hillforts as symbols of wealth and power.

Michael Avery has stated the traditional view of hillforts by saying, "The ultimate defensive weapon of European prehistory was the hillfort of the first millennium B.C.". In contrast, Professor Ronald Hutton wrote in the English Heritage Members' Magazine for March 2020 that hillforts "were assembly places where farming families would meet seasonally".

== Types ==
Beyond the simple definition of hillfort, there is a wide variation in types and periods from the Bronze Age to the Middle Ages. There are considerations of general appearance and topology, which can be assessed without archaeological excavation:

=== Location ===
==== Hilltop contour ====
The prototypical hillfort; an inland location with a hilltop defensive position surrounded by artificial ramparts or steep natural slopes on all sides. Examples include Brent Knoll and Mount Ipf.

==== Inland promontory ====
An inland defensive position on a ridge or spur with steep slopes on two or three sides, and artificial ramparts on the other level approach. An example is Lambert's Castle.

==== Interfluvial ====
A promontory above the confluence of two rivers, or in the bend of a meander. Examples are Kelheim and Miholjanec.

==== Lowland ====
An inland location without special defensive advantages (except perhaps marshes), but surrounded by artificial ramparts; typical of later settled oppida. Examples include Maiden Castle, Old Oswestry, and Stonea Camp.

==== Sea cliff ====
A semi-circular crescent of ramparts backing onto a straight sea cliff; common on rocky Atlantic coasts, such as Ireland and Wales. Examples: Daw's Castle, Dinas Dinlle, Dún Aengus.

==== Sea promontory ====
A linear earthwork across a narrow neck of land leading to a peninsula with steep cliffs to the sea on three sides; common on indented Atlantic coasts, such as Ireland, Cornwall, Brittany and west Wales. Examples: Huelgoat; The Rumps and other promontory forts of Cornwall.

==== Sloping enclosure ====
Or hill-slope enclosure: a smaller earthwork on gently-sloping hillsides; not a significant defensive position. Examples are Goosehill Camp, Plainsfield Camp, and Trendle Ring.

=== Area ===
Very large enclosures, greater than 20 ha in size, were too extensive to defend and were probably used for domesticated animals. An example is Bindon Hill. Enclosures from 1–20 ha in size were defended areas large enough to support permanent tribal settlement, such as Scratchbury Camp. Small enclosures of less than a hectare in size were more likely to be individual farmsteads or animal pens; Trendle Ring is an example.

=== Ramparts, walls and ditches ===
Univallate enclosures are characterized by a single circuit of ramparts for enclosure and defence. For example, Solsbury Hill. A bivallate enclosure has a double circuit of defensive earthworks, such as Battlesbury Camp. Multivallate enclosures consist of more than one layer of defensive earthworks; outer works might not be complete circuits, but defend the weakest approaches; typically the inner circuit is original, with outer circuits added later. Example: Cadbury Castle.

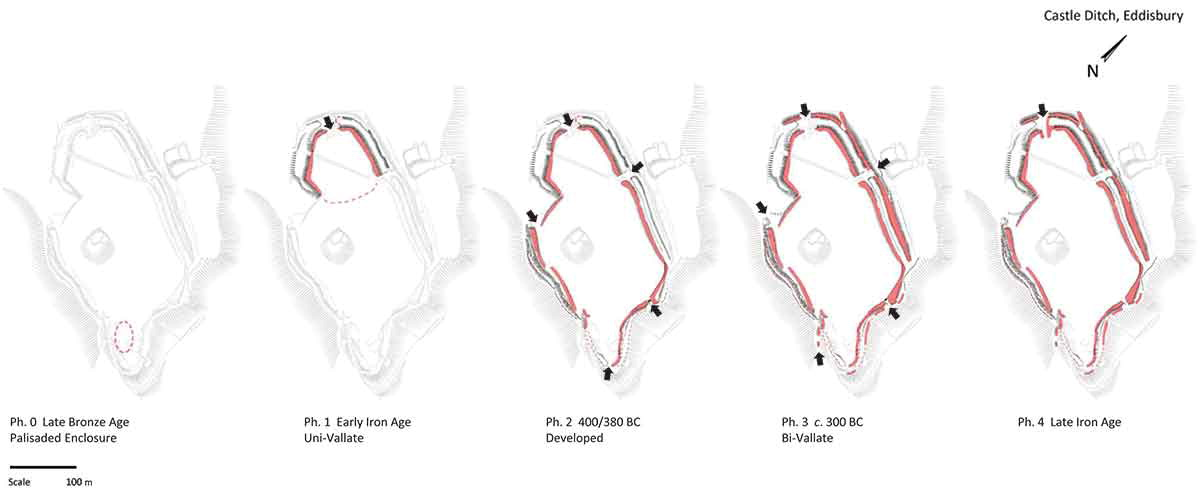
Eddisbury hill fort's development from univallate to bivallate

=== Entrances ===
A simple opening might indicate an enclosure, rather than a defended position; sometimes the main ramparts may turn inward or outward, and be widened and heightened to control the entrance, like at Dowsborough. A linear holloway is a sunken lane with a parallel pair of straight ramparts dominating the entrance; projecting either inward, outward, or occasionally overlapped along the main rampart. An example is Norton Camp. More complex entrances have multiple overlapping outer works; staggered or interleaved multivallate ramparts; zig-zag entryways, sling platforms, and well-planned lines of fire; for example, Maiden Castle.

Some forts were also settlements, while others were only occupied seasonally, or in times of strife. Archaeological excavation reveals more about the dates of occupation and modes of use. Typical features for excavation include:

- Ramparts and ditches
  - Original depths and profiles of ditches
  - Rampart construction such as murus gallicus or pfostenschlitzmauer
  - Guardhouses and defended entrances.
- Settlement and occupation
  - Raised platforms, roundhouses, longhouses.
  - Post holes for rectangular granary huts.
  - Pits for food storage, souterrains, fogous.
  - Pottery
  - Coins, jewellery and hoards.
- Temples and peacetime burials
  - Platforms and temple foundations.
  - Graves and offerings
- Warfare
  - Weapons: sling-shots, shields, armour, swords, axes, spears, arrows.
  - Sieges and conquest: ballista bolts, ash layers, vitrified stones, burnt post holes.
  - Wartime burials, typically outside the ramparts:
    - Contemporary individual burials by local inhabitants.
    - Massed grave pits dug by a conquering army.

== Bronze Age hillforts ==
British hillforts, as now recognised, first appeared in the Late Bronze Age. Archaeologists Sue Hamilton and John Manley believed they were a part of "...substantial landscape and social reconfigurations at the start of the first millennium [BC]", that coincided with the change of three characteristics of British Bronze Age society: "...disappearance of an archaeologically visible burial rite, ... increased deposition of prestige metalwork in rivers, ... and the demise of a middle Bronze Age settlement format of groups of round houses set within enclosures."

They noted that "Accrued place-value may have been important in the establishment of the earliest hillforts. These are often in locations with conspicuous traces of previous ritual monuments. This may have been a means of validating new social practices through making links with the past".

This idea was examined in more depth by ethnologist J. Forde-Johnston, who made note of how a number of Iron Age hillforts had been built close to earlier Bronze Age barrows. Commenting on the fact that both types of monument typically were constructed in high locations, he said, "It is not surprising that the two features should coincide in several dozen cases." He added that it was possible that hillforts had been intentionally sited near barrows for defensive protection from the "...sacred associations of the burial place".

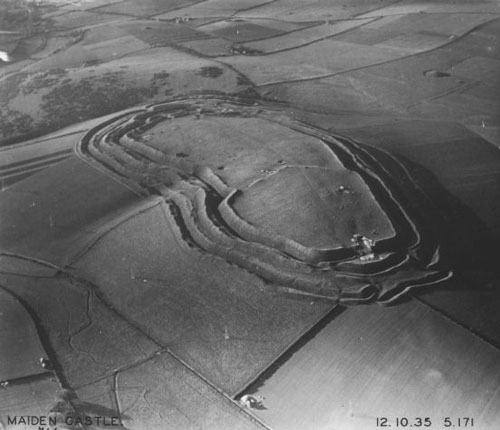
Maiden Castle in England is one of the largest hill forts in Europe. Photograph taken in 1935 by Major George Allen (1891–1940).

== Iron Age hillforts ==
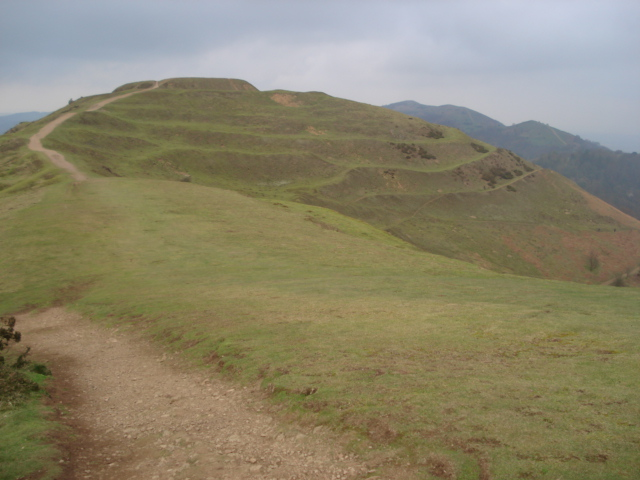
British Camp, a contour hillfort at Herefordshire Beacon

The Iron Age hillforts have remained dominating features in the British landscape: as ethnologist J. Forde-Johnston noted, "Of all the earthworks that are such a notable feature of the landscape in England and Wales few are more prominent or more striking than the hillforts built during the centuries before the Roman conquest." He continued, describing them as an "eloquent testimony of the technical ability and social organization of the Iron Age peoples." On a similar note, the English archaeologist J. C. D. Clark remarked that "[Iron Age] Hillforts are at once among the most impressive and informative of our prehistoric antiquities. They impress by their mere size, by the height of their ramparts, by the depth of their ditches, by the extent of the areas they enclose, and frequently by their commanding position."

There was "immense variation subsumed within the class of monuments called hillforts". Those of the British Iron Age have been characterised as belonging to four different types. The main two are contour and promontory forts, and the lesser two are hill-slope and plateau forts. Contour forts are those "...in which the defences cut off the upper portion of a hill from the ground below by following, more or less, the line of the contours encircling it." Promontory forts are typically defined by "...an area to which the approach is limited, to a greater or lesser extent, by natural features such as cliffs, very steep slopes, rivers etc. Where such features exist little or nothing in the way of man-made fortification is required."

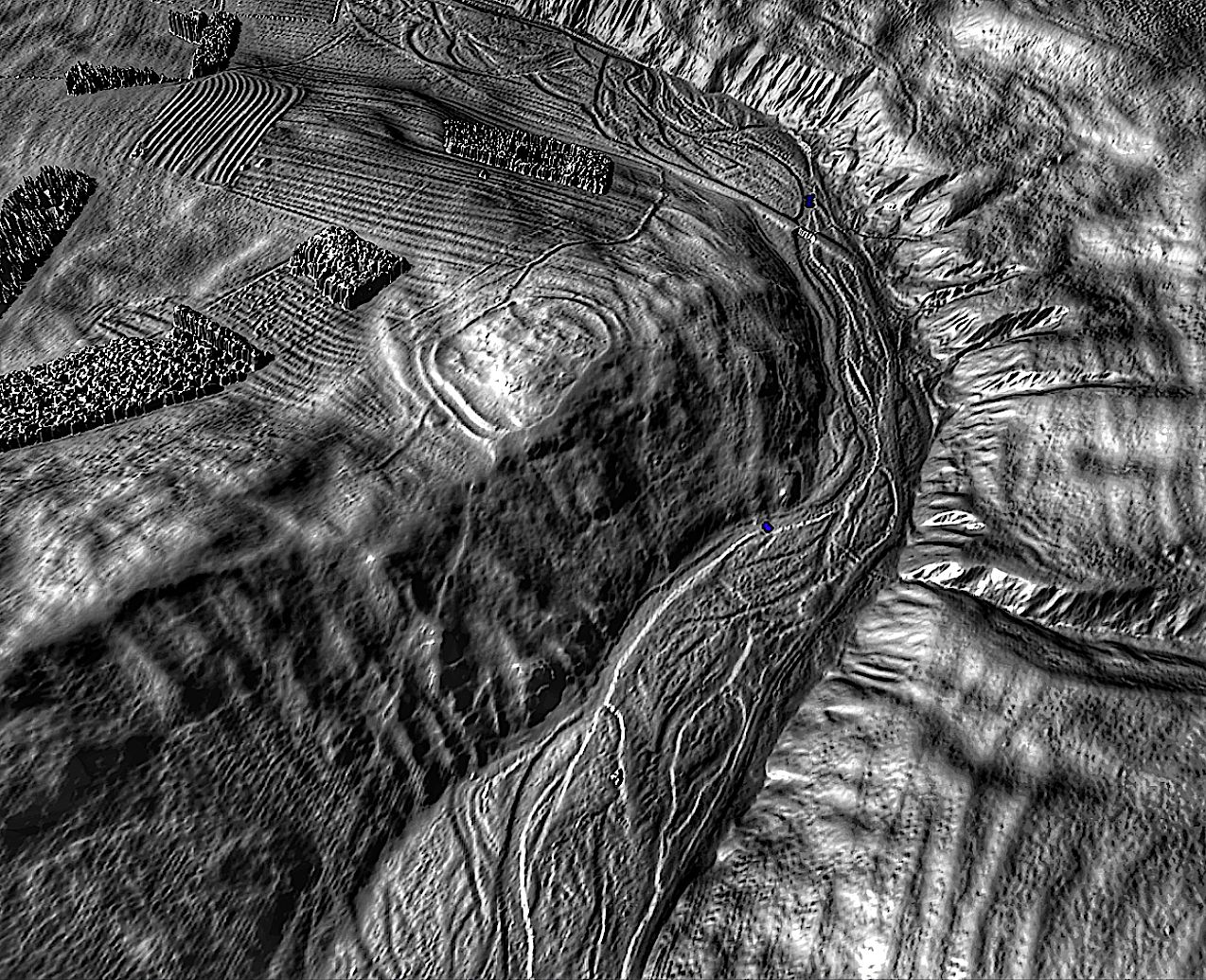
A lidar view of Camp Knowe Iron Age hillfort in Northumberland

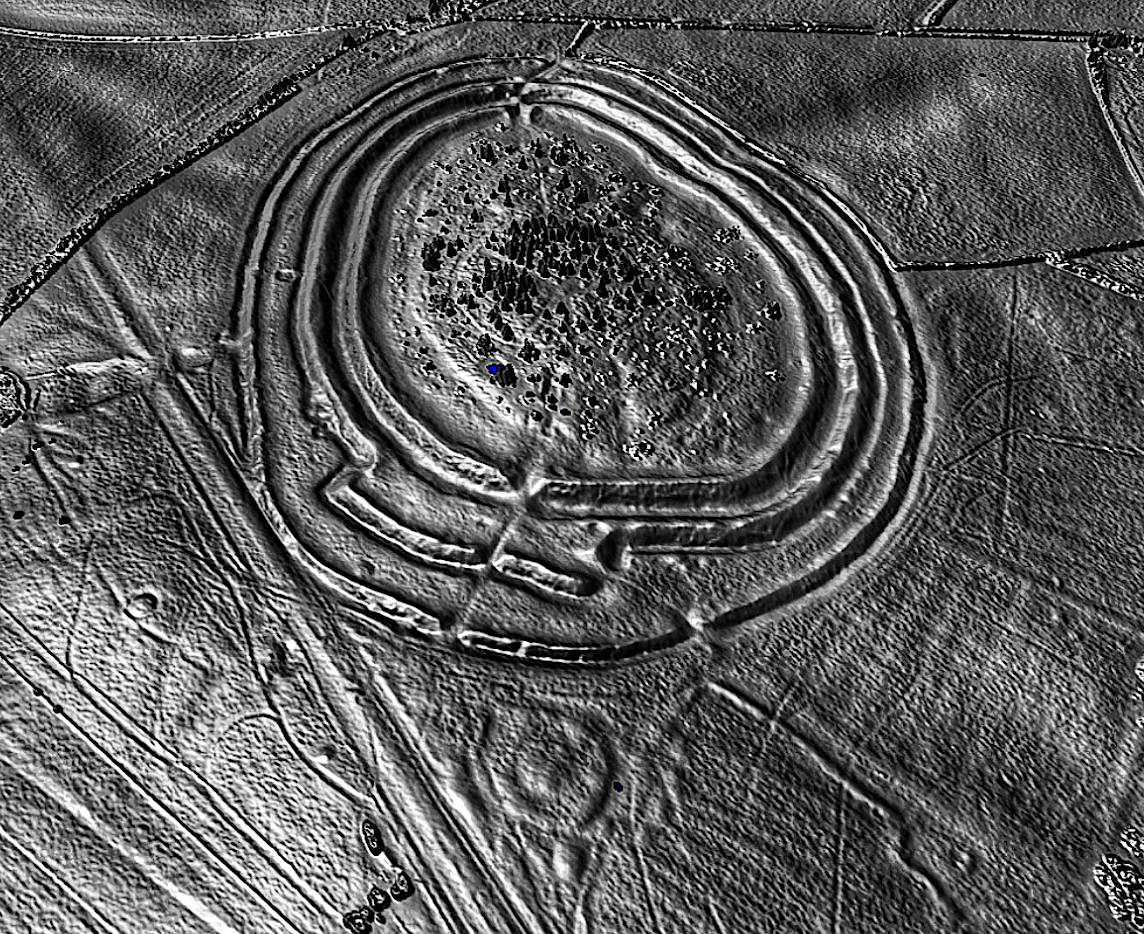
A lidar view of Badbury Rings Iron Age hillfort in Dorset

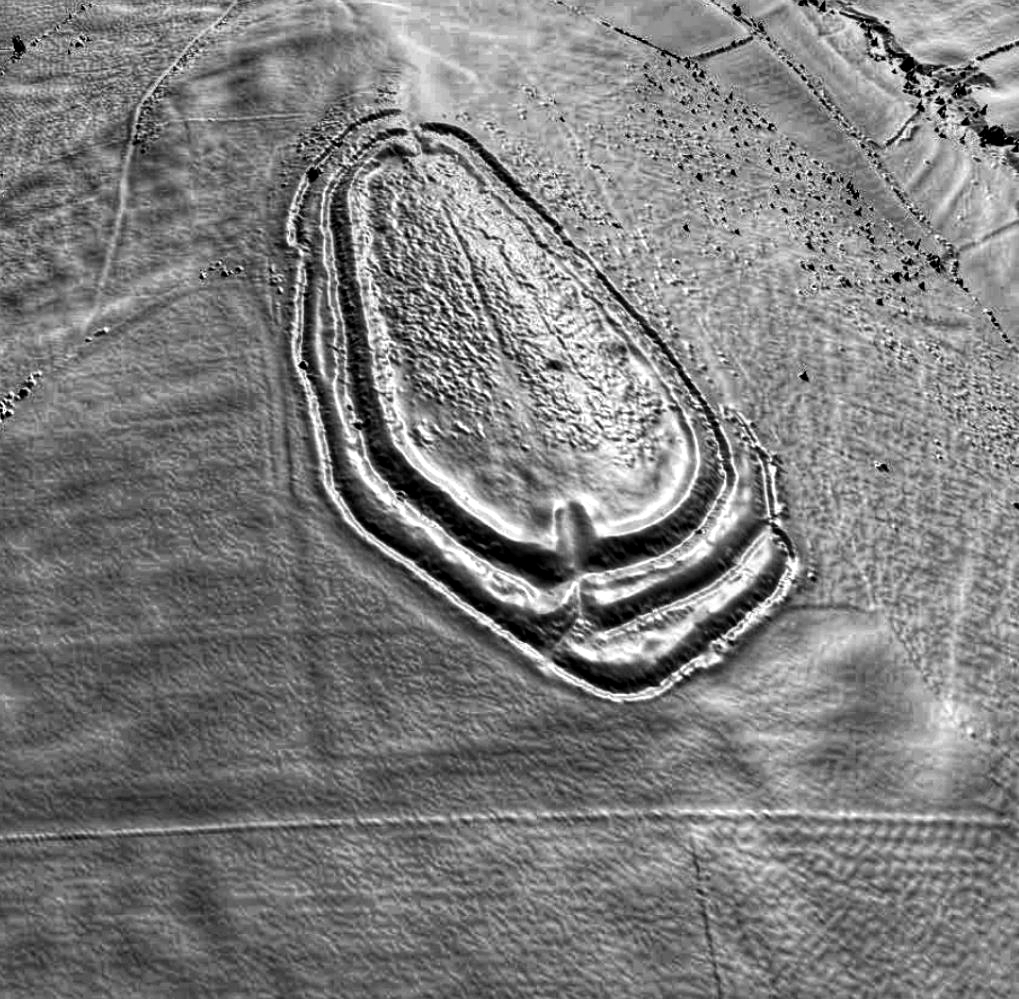
A lidar view of Caer Caradoc (Chapel Lawn) Iron Age hillfort in Shropshire

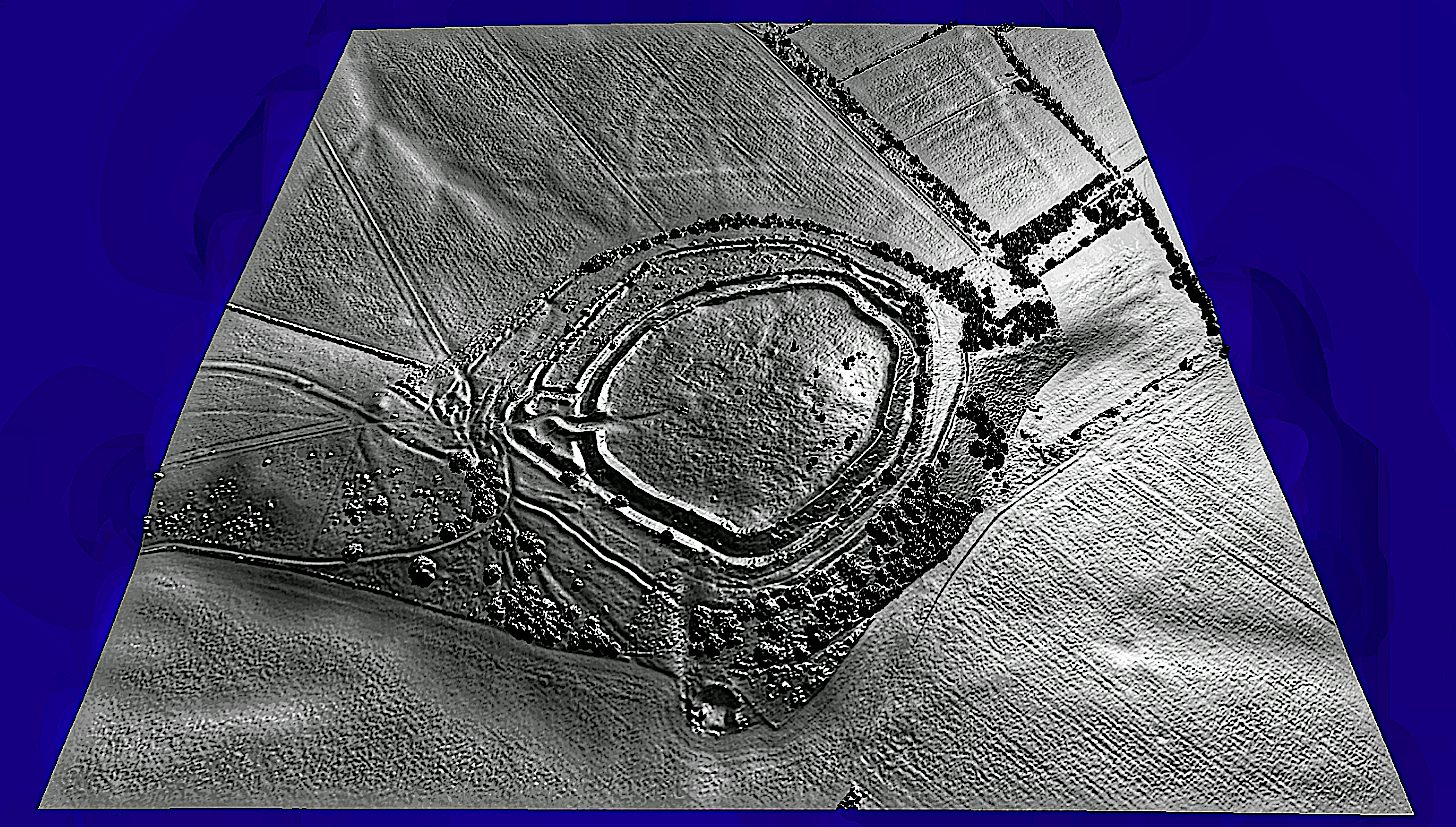
A lidar view of Danebury Iron Age hillfort and Celtic-like field system in Hampshire

Hill-slope hillforts, rather than "enclosing the hilltop in the manner of contour forts, are situated on the sloping ground on one side of it, overlooked by the crest". Plateau forts "face level ground on all sides, regardless of their elevation above sea-level". Plateau forts are often, but by no means always, located on plateaus, hence their name.

Iron Age hillforts made use of both natural and man-made defences. Natural defences include cliffs, steep slopes, rivers, lakes and the sea. Man-made defences largely consist of banks and ditches. There were two forms of banks built at such sites: revetted and glacis. Revetted banks present "a vertical or near-vertical outer face to the enemy. This outer face or revetment is normally of timber or dry stone walling, or a combination of the two, and retains the core of earth, chalk, clay etc., derived in most cases from the outer ditch." Glacis banks "are usually triangular in cross-section and at their simplest consist of a single dump of the material excavated from the ditch."

The number of these such ramparts differs in Iron Age British hillforts. Univallate, are single-rampart only. Multivallate, are multi-rampart forts. Commenting on their distribution across southern Britain, Forde-Johnston stated that "roughly one-third of the Iron Age forts in England and Wales have multivallate defences, the remaining two-thirds being univallate." It has been suggested that only the innermost rampart would be manned, with the other ones serving more to make space and breakup charges.

=== Purpose ===
The reason for why British Iron Age peoples built hillforts is still under dispute. One school of thought, dominant amongst archaeologists in much of the nineteenth and twentieth centuries, holds that they were primarily defensive structures built in an era of intertribal warfare. In the late twentieth century, various archaeologists began to challenge this assumption, claiming that there was not sufficient evidence to back it up. As Mark Bowden and Dave McOmish remarked, "there is a tendency to assume that they were all built for similar purposes and are all performing similar functions", something that they note may well not have been true.

Taking a similar stance, archaeologist Niall Sharples noted that "It is clear from [my] analysis of the sequence [of construction] at Maiden Castle, and by comparison with other sites, such as Danebury, that hillforts do not have a single function. A variety of different activities can be associated with these sites and with time the importance or perhaps the emphasis of certain activities changed dramatically."

==== Defensive usage ====
It has been traditionally assumed that hillforts were constructed for defensive purposes in the Iron Age. Describing warfare of the period, archaeologist Niall Sharples stated that war was such an integral part of all agricultural human societies that it was possible "to believe a priori that after the introduction of agriculture [in the Neolithic,] warfare was a constant feature of the prehistoric societies of the British Isles." It was in this context, he believed, that hillforts were constructed as defensive positions.

In 1948, J.G.D. Clark commented that hillforts' "defensive character cannot be stressed too often." Another archaeologist to hold a similar viewpoint, Barry Cunliffe, a specialist in the Iron Age, believed that hillforts from this period were defensive settlements.

Various archaeologists have called into question the defensive capacity of many hillforts. Using the case study of the Scratchbury hillfort in Wiltshire, Bowden and McOmish noted that "The positioning of [the fort] suggests that it was not built for defence" because "a potential assailant is enabled to observe all the dispositions of the defence", thereby leaving it particularly vulnerable to attackers. On a similar note, archaeologists Sue Hamilton and John Manley, after investigating the forts in south-east England, noted that for this region, "It is noteworthy that most of the hillforts are univallate, and lack the in-depth perimeter elaboration which elsewhere has been ascribed a defensive role."

Niall Sharples, after accepting that many British hillforts were not particularly defensible, theorised that Iron Age warfare in Britain, like much warfare around the world, did not consist purely of physical violence, but instead might have primarily "...involved ritualised display and threatening behaviour. I believe that the bulk of the evidence for warfare in the archaeological record [which included hillforts] is created as a deterrent, or to symbolise the nature of the conflict rather than actually the physical act." In this manner, hillforts would have in many respects been symbolically defensive rather than practically so, in a period when warfare was primarily about being threatening to your enemies rather than entering into open conflict with them.

==== Ceremonial and ritual usage ====
In 1989, Mark Bowden and Dave McOmish noted that "The idea that some hillforts performed ceremonial functions is not a new one but discussion has concentrated on the possible existence of shrines and temples within the defences." Instead, they proposed that "The morphology and topography of the ramparts themselves may indicate ceremonial activity".

Sue Hamilton and John Manley noted that archaeologists must keep in mind a phenomenological view of hillforts within their landscapes, noting that "Hillforts provide a defined location from which to view the 'world' ... Such an experience of changing visual perspectives is largely lost in academic publication, yet it must have been a preeminent aspect of how hillfort builders and users described and understood hillforts."

=== Southern Britain in the Romano-British Iron Age ===
In the 1st century, southern Britain was conquered and absorbed into the Roman Empire, leading to the creation of a hybrid Romano-British culture within what is now known as Roman Britain.

It appears as though settlement ceased at many hill forts in Roman Britain. For instance, excavators working at the Dinas Powys hillfort in the Vale of Glamorgan, southern Wales, noted that although artefacts that were clearly Romano-British in nature were found at the site, they were not found in sufficient quantities to imply settlement, and that there was also no evidence of any construction going on during the first four centuries AD. They concluded therefore that under Roman rule, Dinas Powys had been effectively abandoned.

In the extreme southwest, enclosed settlements, albeit on a much smaller scale, continued to be constructed, such as at Chysauster or the 'Rounds' found in Cornwall—presumably reflecting a lesser degree of Roman influence, which continued through into Sub-Roman Britain.

=== Northern Britain ===
The Roman Empire never occupied northern Britain, which at this time was largely the geographical equivalent to the later nation-state of Scotland. As such, a native British Iron Age culture was able to continue here with less imperial interference. This had some bearing on the nature of hill forts in this period. Archaeologist Leslie Alcock noted that a fort-building hiatus in the early centuries [AD] was followed by a new wave of construction—beginning in the third century, gathering momentum in the fifth, and perhaps extending through to the eighth. Out of all northern forts with radiometric dates, about half were either earlier forts that had been refurbished in the later period, or were newly constructed on virgin sites in the later period.

== Early Medieval hillforts ==
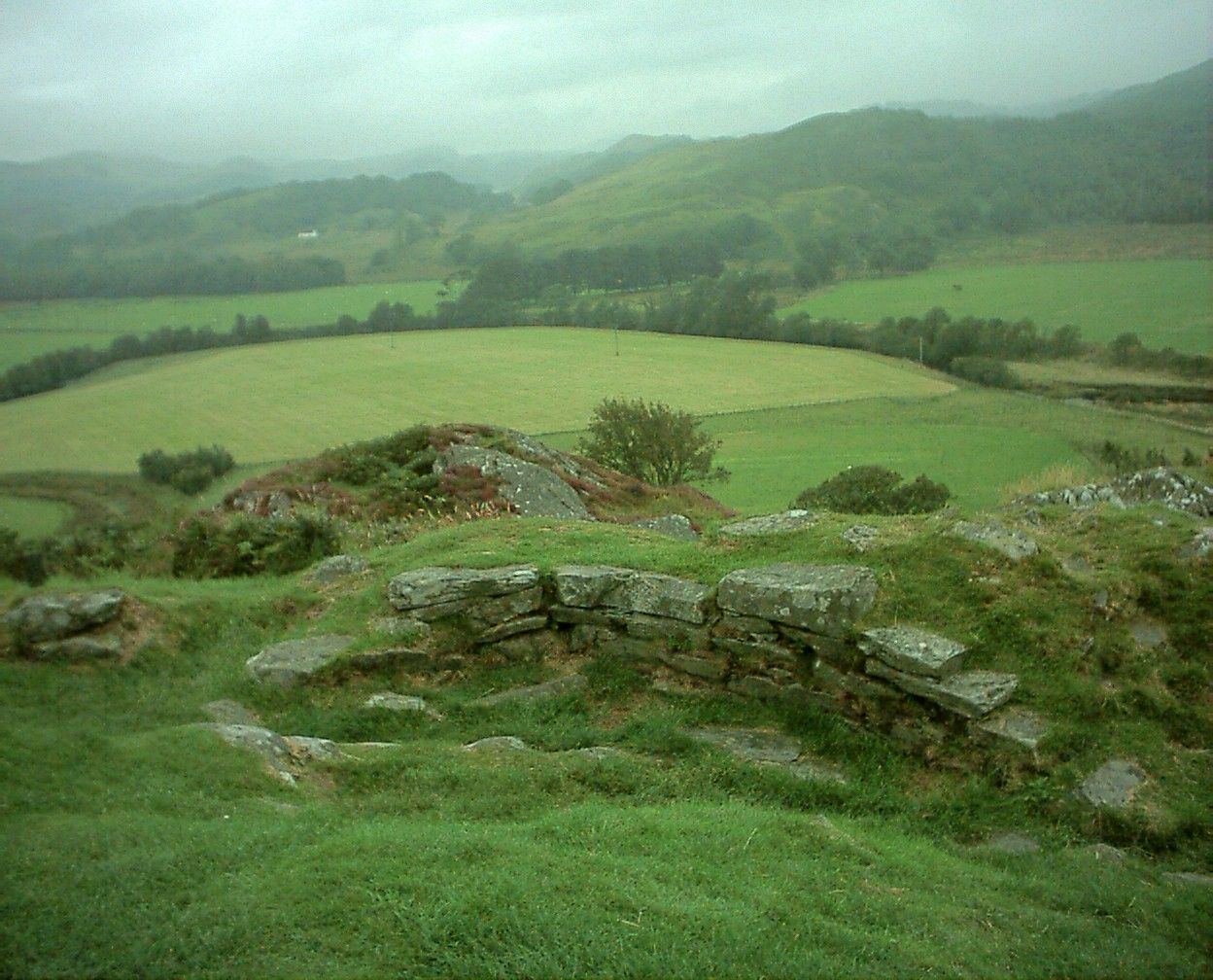
Dunadd hill fort near Kilmartin in Argyll, similar to ring-forts in Ireland and Iberian castros

In the early medieval period, which began in the fifth century AD, much of southern Britain, comprising much of the area that later became the nation-state of England, adopted a variant of Germanic culture from continental Europe, likely due to migration from that region. These Germanic peoples, the Anglo-Saxons, typically did not build or re-use hillforts. In Northern and Western Britain, areas that retained a cultural link to the earlier Iron Age, hillfort use continued.

After looking at the difference between Iron Age and early medieval hill forts, archaeologist Leslie Alcock thought it reasonable to infer that political and social conditions that demanded the massive pre-Roman Iron Age hillforts—and had the labour to build them—no longer existed in [the fifth and sixth centuries AD]. This implies a remarkable change in social organization.

=== Western Britain ===
In Wales and the West Country, Iron Age British culture continued, largely free from the adoption of Anglo-Saxon culture. For instance, the Dinas Powys hillfort in South Wales saw resettlement in the fifth century, as did South Cadbury Hillfort which has revealed significant evidence for the construction of a Sub-Roman 'Great Hall' within the enclosure, having long been associated with the mythical Camelot.

In other cases, defensive positions were reoccupied. For instance, on the defensive peninsula of Tintagel in Cornwall, a promontory fort known as Tintagel Castle was built in the early medieval period, with archaeologists believing that it acted as a "stronghold for the post-Roman kings of Dumnonia."

Several similar promontory forts of Cornwall, as well as in neighbouring Brittany, show signs of occupation from this period and are often associated with so-called 'Celtic Christian' hermitages and/or chapels such as at Rame Head, St Ives, St Michael's Mount, Mont Saint-Michel, Burgh Island and Looe Island excavated by Channel 4's archaeological television programme Time Team. A later example can be found at Castell Dinas Brân, where a hillfort of c.600 BC was the location for a stone castle built in the 13th century AD.

=== Northern Britain ===
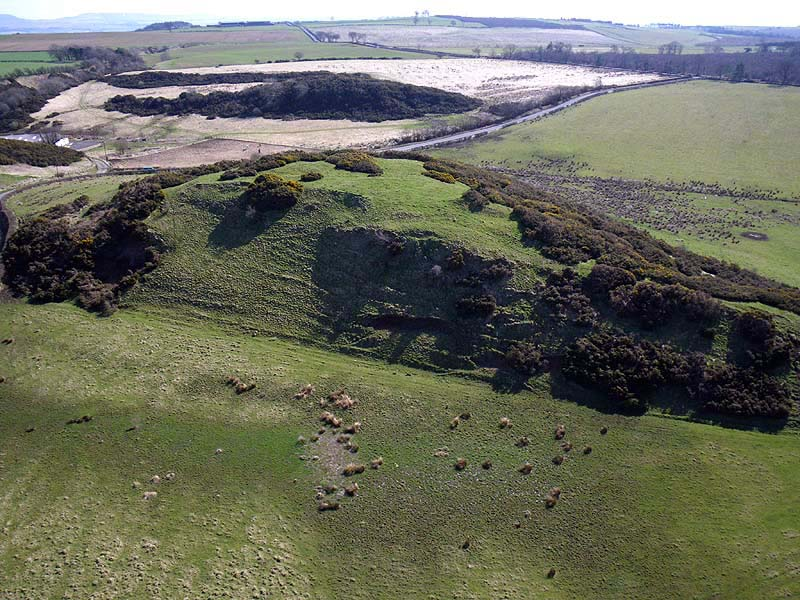
An aerial photo of Peace Knowe Hillfort in West Lothian

Northern Britain was never conquered by the Roman Empire, and so the Iron Age proceeded directly into the early medieval without imperialist intervention. According to archaeologist Leslie Alcock, "warfare" was perhaps the "principal social activity in Early Historic northern Britain", playing a major part in "contemporary prose and poetry", and for this reason many hill forts of this period have been commonly thought of as defensive structures designed to repel attack.

Hill forts occupied in the early medieval period appear to have primarily been settlements for the social elite, the ruling classes who governed society. The northern British peoples who constructed hill forts knew of various forms of the monuments, leading Alcock to note that "the three Celtic peoples of northern Britain [Britons, Picts and Gaels] were fully aware of the potential of different types of fort, and used them variously, taking account only of local terrain, building materials, and politico-military needs."

== See also ==
- List of hill forts in England
- List of hill forts in Scotland
- List of hill forts in Wales
