= Ruborough Camp =

Iron Age hillfort in Somerset, England

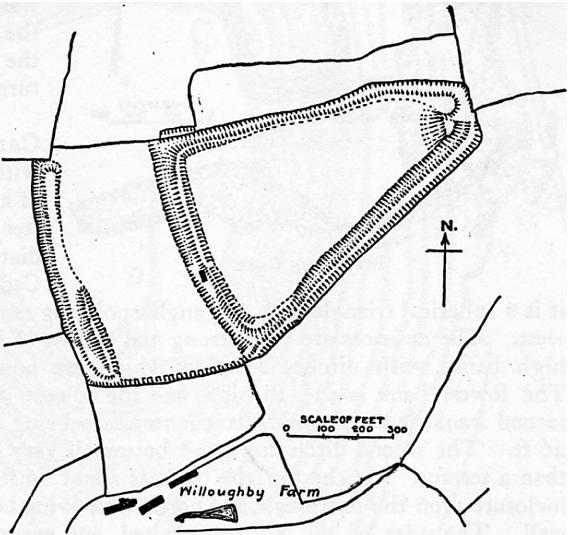
- Plan of earthworks at Ruborough Camp

- Location within Somerset
- 51°05′46″N 3°06′18″W
- Location: Broomfield, Somerset, England

History
- Built: Iron Age

Site notes
- Area: 1.8 hectares (4.4 acres)

Scheduled monument
- Reference no.: 191142

Ruborough Camp is an Iron Age hill fort on the Quantock Hills near Broomfield in Somerset, England. The name comes from Rugan beorh or Ruwan-beorge meaning Rough Hill. It is a Scheduled Ancient Monument and on the Heritage at Risk Register.

== Description ==
The hill fort is on an easterly spur from the main Quantock ridge, with steep natural slopes to the north and south-east. The fort is triangular in shape, with a single rampart and ditch (univallate), enclosing 1.8 hectares (4.4 acres). There is a linear outer work about 120 m away, parallel to the westerly rampart, enclosing another 1.8 ha.

There was a tunnel, which has now been filed in, which gave the camp safe access to a nearby spring for water.

It was common for ancient hill forts to be reused as pens for domesticated animals in the Medieval period, and there is documentary evidence that Ruborough became a porcheria, or piggery, owned by the Saxon domain of Somerton.

== See also ==
- Plainsfield Camp
- Dowsborough
- Trendle Ring
- List of hill forts and ancient settlements in Somerset
- Hillforts in Britain
- Hillfort
