= Din =

DIN or Din or din may refer to:

== People and language ==
- Din (name), people with the name
- Dīn, an Arabic word with three general senses: judgment, custom, and religion from which the name originates
- Dinka language (ISO 639 code: din), spoken by the major ethnic group of South Sudan

== Places ==
- Dīn or Lavardin, Iran

== Media and entertainment ==
- Din, a goddess in The Legend of Zelda series of video games
- Din, a member of the Harvard Din & Tonics
- "Din", a song by Therion from the album Sitra Ahra (album)
- DIN, a music project founded by Ontario-based composer Jean-Claude Cutz
- Din (EP), by Oscar Zia
- Din (din is noise), a free software musical instrument & audio synthesizer
- din_fiv, a music project by San Francisco-based composer David Din (Da5id Din)
- Din News, Pakistani 24-hour news channel
- Dins, a 2006 studio album by Psychic Ills
- Din: The Day, a 2022 Bangladeshi film

== Organizations ==
- Deutsches Institut für Normung (DIN), German Institute for Standardization
  - List of DIN standards
    - DIN 1451, a font
    - DIN connector, a set of electrical connector standards
    - DIN film speed, a former film speed standard
    - DIN paper size, see International standard paper sizes
    - DIN 72552, a standard for labeling the electric terminals in automotive wiring
    - DIN 75490, a size standard for automotive dashboard units that has been adopted by ISO
- Nakam, also known as Din (judgement), a Jewish group that attempted to get revenge for the Holocaust

== Other uses ==
- Drug identification number, a unique number given to all drugs sold in Canada
- Gevurah (Kabbalah) or Din, one of the ten aspects of the Ein Sof in Kabbalah
- DIN, currency symbol for the Serbian dinar
- DIN, vehicle registration for the German town of Dinslaken
- 1,5-Diisocyanonaphthalene, a chemical compound

== See also ==
- Deen (disambiguation)
- Dina (disambiguation)
- Dhina (disambiguation)
