= DINA =

DINA may refer to:

- Dirección de Inteligencia Nacional (DINA), the Chilean secret police under the Pinochet regime
- DINA S.A., a Mexican truck and bus manufacturer

== See also ==
- Dina (disambiguation)
- DINO
- DIN (disambiguation)
