= Dina (disambiguation) =

Dina may refer to:

== Places ==
- Dina, Alberta, a locality in Canada
- Dina, Pakistan, a city in the Punjab
  - Dina Tehsil, the subdivision surrounding the city
- Dina, a village in India where Guru Gobind Singh wrote the letter Zafarnamah
- Dina river, Maharashtra, India

== People ==
- Dina (given name), a female name with a list of notable people
- Dina (surname), a surname also containing a list of people with that name
- Dina (belly dancer), Egyptian belly dancer Dina Tala'at (born 1964)
- Dina (musician), stage name of Norwegian pop musician Caroline Kongerud (born 1985)
- Dina (singer), Portuguese singer and songwriter born Ondina Maria Farias Veloso in 1956
- Dina Nadzir and Dina, stage names of Faradina Mohd. Nadzir, Malaysian Idol 2004 runner-up

== Arts and entertainment ==
- Dina (film), a 2017 American documentary film directed by Antonio Santini and Dan Sickles
- Dina, a genie in the 2002–2004 Spanish sitcom ¡Ala... Dina!
- Dina, the protagonist of the 2002 Norwegian film I Am Dina
- Dina (video game console), released in 1986

== Other uses ==
- Cyclone Dina, a 2002 cyclone
- Dina (annelid), a genus of leeches in the family Erpobdellidae
- MFK Dina Moskva, a Russian futsal club based in Moscow
- Dina railway station, Dina, Punjab, Pakistan

== See also ==
- DINA (disambiguation)
- Dyna
- Dhina (disambiguation)
- Dena (disambiguation)
- Dinah (disambiguation)
- Dinas (disambiguation)
- Dynas
