= Deen =

Deen may refer to:

== People ==
- Deen (singer), singer from Bosnia and Herzegovina
- Deen Castronovo, American musician
- Branson Deen (born 2000), American football player
- Daniël Deen (born 2003), Dutch footballer
- James Deen, American pornographic actor
- Paula Deen (born 1947), American chef and TV personality

== Other uses ==
- Dīn (also Deen), an Arabic word and Qur'anic term (دين) meaning "religion".
- Deen (band), a Japanese band
  - Deen (album)
- Studio Deen, a Japanese animation studio
- River Deen (Dinin, Dinan), Ireland

== See also ==
- Dean (disambiguation)
- Deane (disambiguation)
- Deena (disambiguation)
- Dheena (disambiguation)
- Din (disambiguation)
- Dina (disambiguation)
