= Enclosure (archaeology) =

Archaeological feature

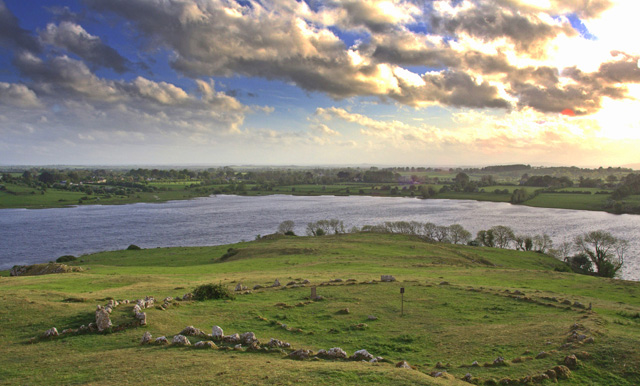
- Image of a Late Bronze Age enclosure at Knockadoon
- Race: Multiracial
- Religion: Non-specific
- Geographical range: Mainland
- Period: Typically neolithic
- Type site: Archaeological site

In archaeology, an enclosure is one of the most common types of archaeological site – It is any area of land separated from surrounding land by earthworks, walls or fencing. Such a simple feature is found all over the world and during almost all archaeological periods. They may be few metres across or be large enough to encompass whole cities.

Archaeological enclosures are typically representative of recurrent patterns of human activity throughout history through landscape. The absolute definition of archaeological enclosures has been debated over time. Some suggest that at a general level, enclosure (archaeologically) could be defined as the replacement of open-fields with privately owned-fields through walls, banks, and dividers. However, this definition has been criticised, as it appears many archaeological enclosures are not enclosed by a physical boundary.

Enclosures served numerous practical purposes including being used to delineate settlement areas, to create defensive positions, or to be used as animal pens. They were also widely adopted in ritual and burial practices and seem to demonstrate a fundamental human desire to make physical boundaries around spaces. Some economic historians speculate that the introduction of archaeological enclosures likely caused a shift into historical capitalist economies. Along with most archaeological interests, enclosure sites have been most researched and notably progressive during the Stone Age, the Bronze Age, and the Iron Age.

More modern methods used to identify archaeological enclosures have been studied and developed by economic historians, historical geographers, landscape historians and trained archaeologists. Even in current times, through using accessible technology, many non-trained individuals have become interested in archaeological enclosures through methods such as satellite imaging. Enclosures created from ditches and banks or walling can often be identified in the field through aerial photography or ground survey. Other types of enclosures leave less permanent records and may only be identified during excavation.

== Types of enclosure ==
- Banjo enclosures
- Causewayed enclosures
- Enclosed cremation cemeteries
- Henges
- Henge enclosures
- Hill-slope enclosures
- Kraals
- Neolithic circular enclosures in Central Europe
- Oppida
- Ring ditches
- Stone circles
- Timber circles
- Tor enclosures

== Archaeological enclosure servings and purposes ==
=== Ritual ===
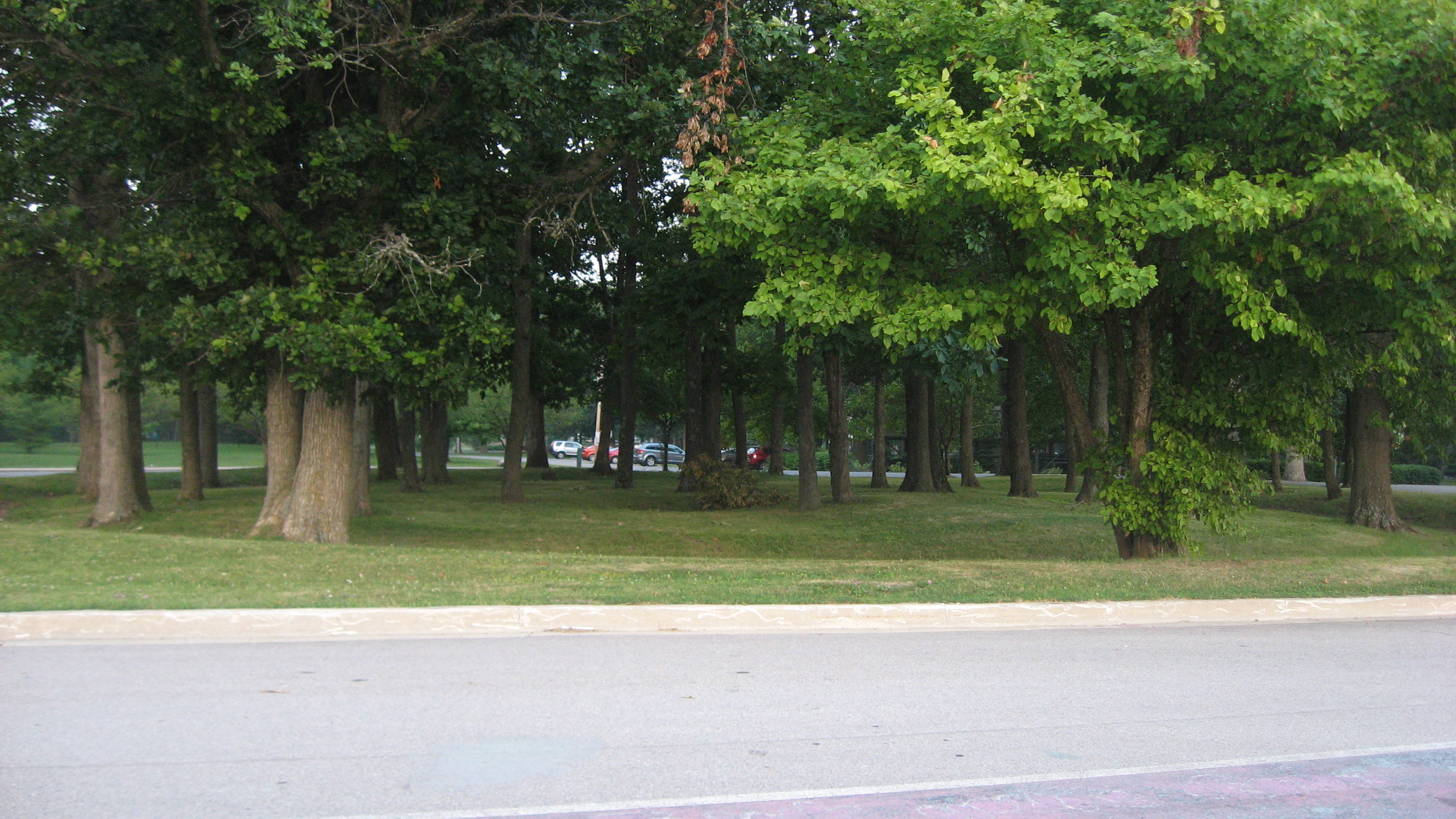
A ceremonial enclosure, the Chrysler Enclosure in the United States. See the shallow ditch on the edges of the grassy area.

Uses of archaeological enclosures for rituals date back to early Neolithic Age. Ritual sites often used roofless enclosures for dances, customs, mourning ceremonies. Sites such as the Native American Chumash sacred enclosures were positioned towards the middle of settlements and were often built for priests. Conversely, sites such as the Lismullin Henge in Ireland (520-370 B.C.) were created and positioned meteorologically to celebrate summer and winter solstices. Many archaeological enclosures that were once considered defensive and fortified are recently being understood as ritualistic after instances of skulls and other human bones have recently revealed to have been laid in deposits within enclosures — suggesting a recurring ritual, rather than war or other forms of battles.

=== Fortification ===
The use of enclosures as defensive structures are considered to have first been used in Mesolithic times. Archaeological sites such as causewayed enclosures, enceinte enclosures, and other fortification enclosures were generally considered among the popular defensive models. For example, the Tel Jezreel enclosure built during 9th century Israel was once the central military base for the Royal Israelite army. Large scale excavation has revealed that most fortification enclosures, including Tel Jezreel, were built using layers of soil and stones to provide solid protection and defence.

=== Settlement ===
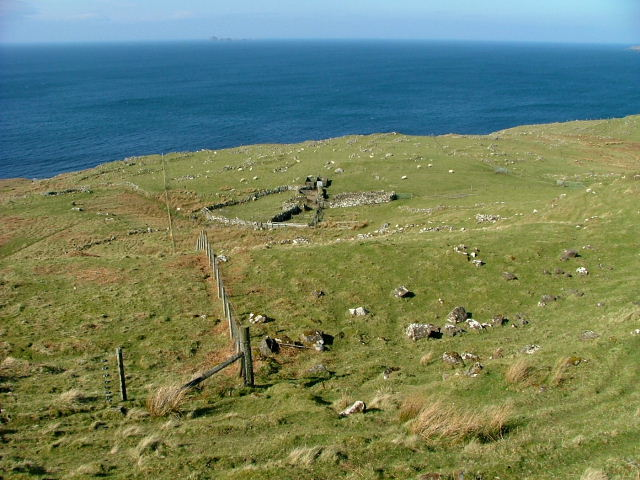
Medieval livestock enclosure at a crofting settlement, Score

Many archaeological enclosure sites throughout time have been used as dwellings, settlements and animal enclosing sites. Economic dependency, kinship, and social hierarchy all influenced the regular implementation of enclosures within communities. Some enclosures contained just single houses, while others contained entire communities within them. Enclosure entrances were usually found on the sides of the structure, with doorways into the enclosures often consisting of kerb-stones and vertical wooden jambs. The most common form of settlement enclosure was a kraal enclosure, which consisted of multiple houses surrounding a livestock enclosure.

== Identification methods and techniques ==
Identification for archaeological enclosures developed five pillars of scientific archaeology method from 1860 onwards. These pillars consisted of small find and plain artefact, field notes / photography / maps / excavation, stratigraphic excavation, and publication of results, and indigenous rights. In more recent times, the methods of identification have become technologically advanced and less invasive.

=== Google Earth ===
Especially popular amongst amateur archaeologists, Google Earth is used for its satellite imaging techniques that reveal indications of eroded archaeological sites. Methods of aerial photographs were first popularised in the 1930s, but current universal access of websites such as Google Earth has provided un-restricted access to such images. Due to the nature of Google Earths high resolution imagery, it has allowed access for speculation into the landscape of inaccessible areas. These satellite images often show the uncovered or eroding areas of archaeological enclosures and settlement mounds that are exposed.

=== Light Detection and Ranging (LiDAR) ===
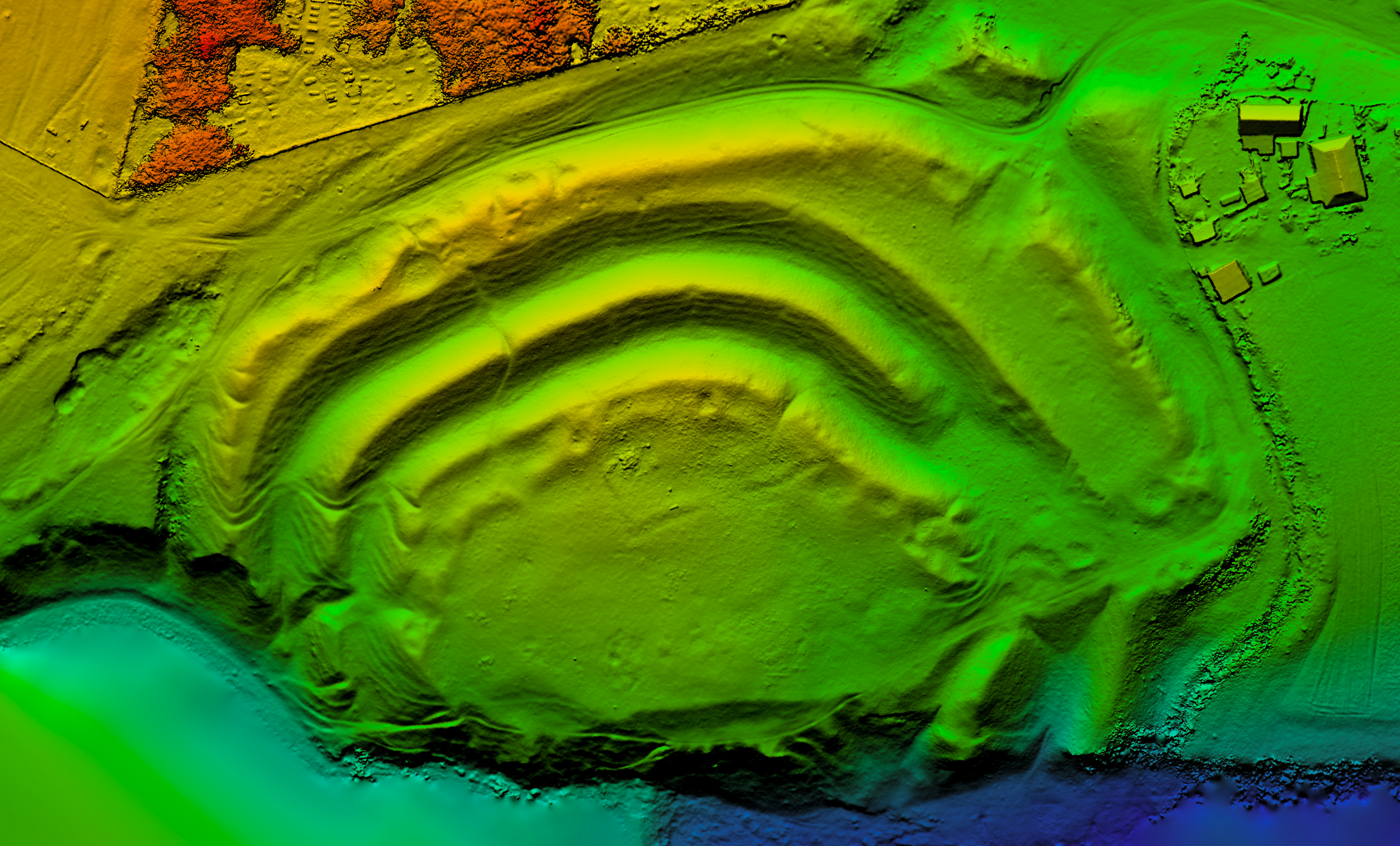
Terrain model of archaeological site The Fort of Kudin City, 9-13 centuries, Ukraine, Khmelnytsky region. Created using LiDAR.

LiDAR is an aerial tool introduced to archaeology in the 1970s, and in modern times has been used greatly amongst the archaeological community for remote sensing. LiDAR has developed popularity in recent years among the archaeological community. It is able to produce three-dimensional mapping of earthworks and high-resolution topographical data. LiDAR's advantages can be attributed to its flexibility, small laser footprint, non-invasive technology, price, and far-reaching field of view. The most prominent and discussed advantage of LiDAR is its ability to map human impact through identifying cultural features of landscapes. However, LiDAR is restricted in its ability to maintain effectiveness when mapping large areas.

=== Ground Penetrating Radar (GPR) ===
Ground penetrating radar (GPR) is a non-invasive technique to identify manmade buildings such as enclosures and walls. GPR uses downward facing energy to identify clustered, enclosed areas that other geophysical techniques are often unable to detect. Moreover, it uses high frequency radar pulses from a surface antenna. GPR was popularised for its centimetre accuracy and ground penetration.

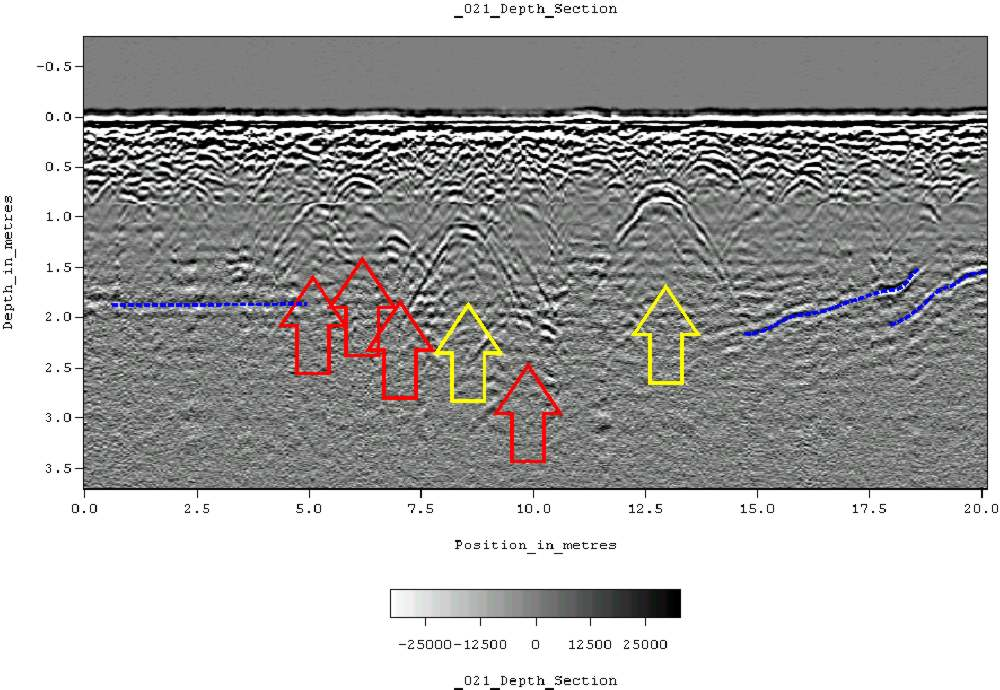
Ground Penetrating Radar, where arrows represent depressions in the ground - likely representing human burials.

== Early signs of archaeological enclosure ==
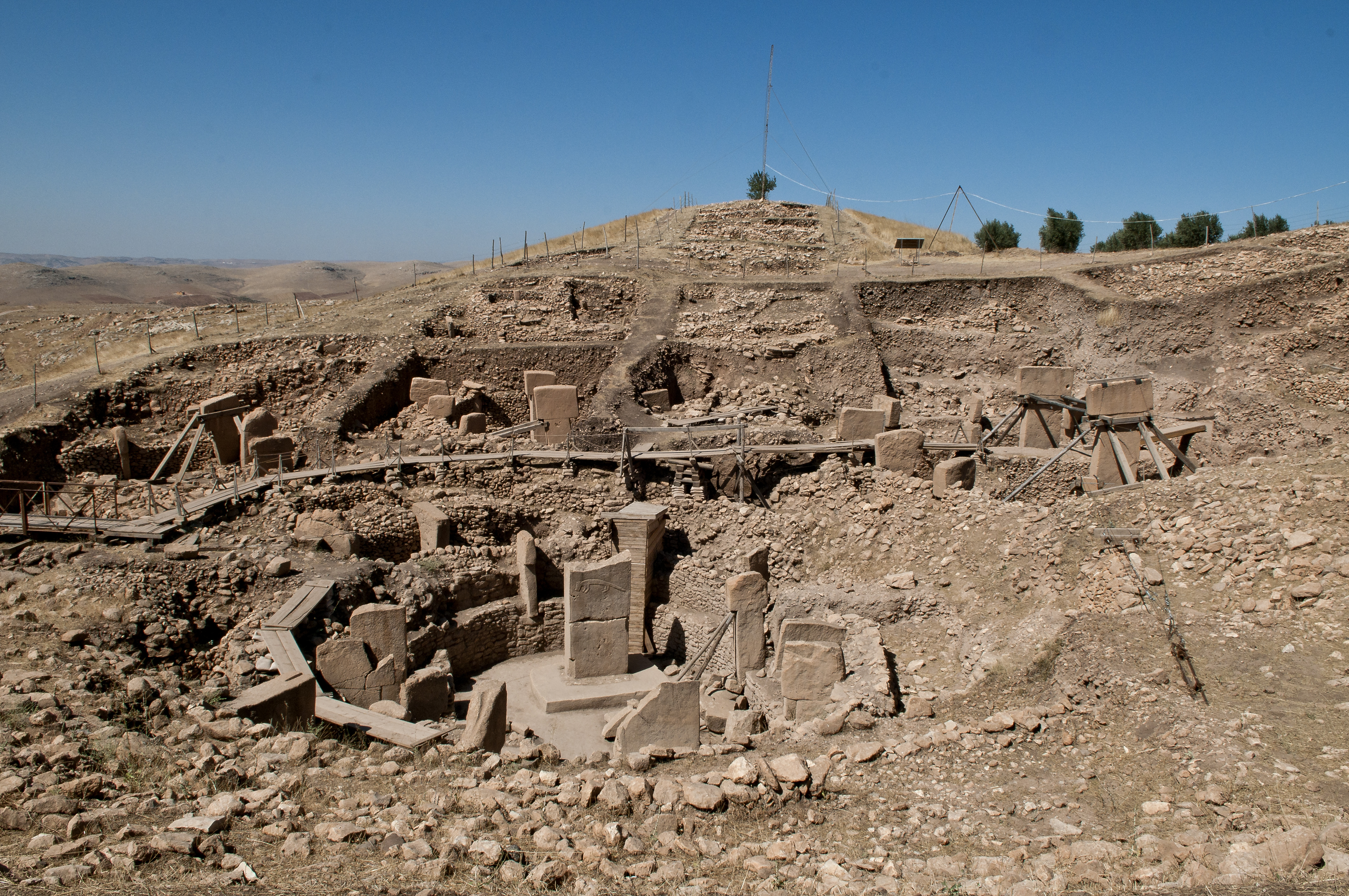
Image of Göbekli Tepe, Urfa

The oldest archaeological site that in some way involved an enclosure is Göbekli Tepe, a site from the late stone / Neolithic age in South-eastern Turkey first noted in 1963. The site contains over 200 limestone pillars within multiple stone circle enclosures (each enclosure being designated A-H). The length of these enclosures span up to 20 meters in diameter, and the pillars up to 5.5 meters. These structures were thought to be over 11,000 years old, however the exact date of the creation of Göbekli Tepe is still unknown.

It is speculated that the enclosures of the site were likely built by hunter-gatherers of the time, due to the significant variety of animal bones uncovered around the site. However, these bones could be related to evidence suggesting that Göbekli Tepe was not a settlement like most archaeological sites from that time, but rather a temple likely used for death rituals. It is estimated that creation of one of the enclosures would have required hundreds of builders, and construction would have taken place over a significantly long period of time. Many of the pillars and enclosures are thought to be landmarks for storytelling amongst the population, with data suggesting that snakes, boars and cranes are the most represented animal depicted within the carvings and pictographs.

The lead excavator of the site, Klaus Schmidt, believed the site was a cult of the dead. This suggestion is further noted by recent findings of potential skulls within the walls and floors. It is possible that each enclosure within the site was representative of different groups, and pictographs within the walls aligned with clans beliefs or traditions.

== The Three Age System and common archaeological enclosure sites ==
=== The Stone Age (3.4 mya - 2000bce) ===
==== Causewayed Enclosures ====
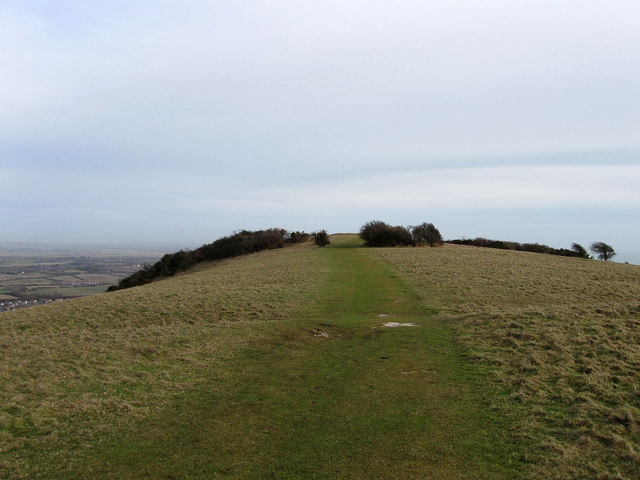
Causewayed Enclosure, Combe Hill. Dating from the Neolithic age.

One example of an enclosure suggested to be created in the Neolithic Stone Age are causewayed enclosures (otherwise referred to as 'causewayed camps'). They are the earliest known form of open space enclosures. It is believed causewayed enclosures originated in mainland Europe and spread through France, Germany, Scandinavia and the British Isles. The enclosures are characterised by their oval or circular shape, and often having a concentric circuit for banks and ditches of up to 20 meters long. It is suggested the functions of the enclosures were for communal meetings, settlement, and burial sites.

=== The Bronze Age (3300 - 1200 bce) ===
==== Cursus Monuments ====
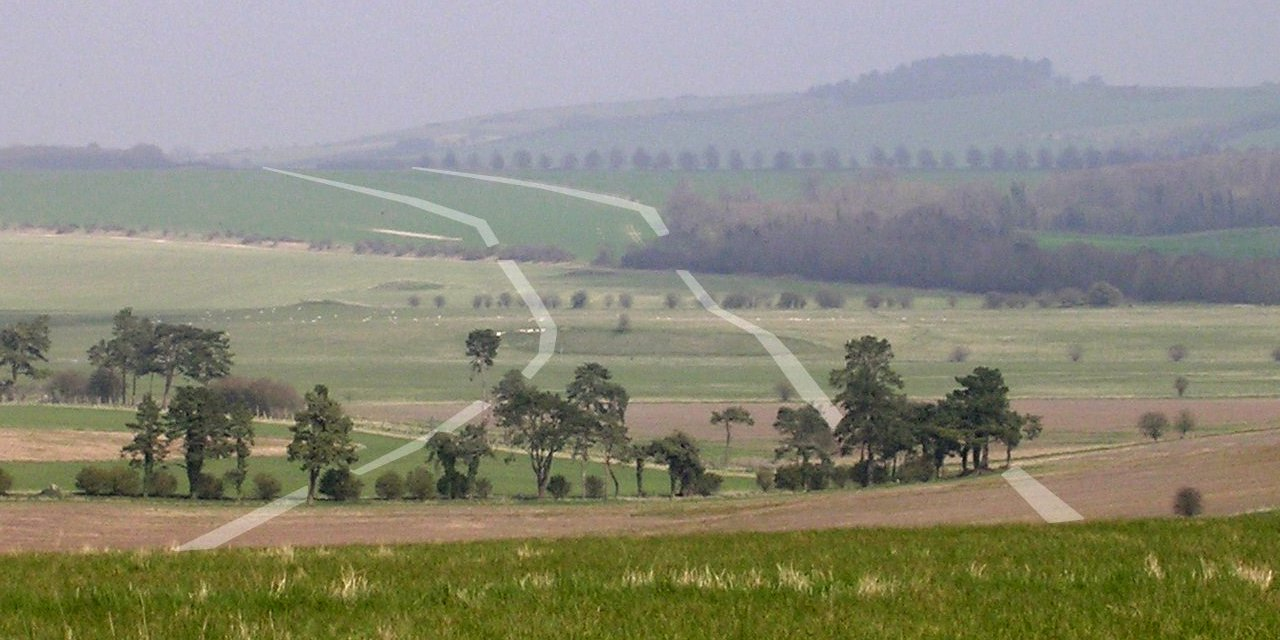
Dorset Cursus route across Wyke down

Cursus monuments are archaeological enclosures most commonly noted throughout British, Scottish and Irish earthwork. They are characterised as being long, narrow pairs of enclosures generally dating back to 4000-2500BC. Cursus monuments often resemble ditches in the ground, as their rectangular walls are often outlined structurally by materials such as wood. These monuments are most often discovered through aerial imaging, and other ground penetrating methods. These enclosures range in length from 10 km (as seen in the Dorset Cursus), to around 50 meters approximately. There is no approximate width of any known cursus monuments, as it varies depending on the purpose. There are few entrances to cursuses enclosures, but most often seen as gaps along the side of the earthwork. The purpose of cursus monuments are considered mostly to be used for guides, barriers for districts, and most commonly for ritualistic and ceremonial purposes.

==== Mar Hall ====
The Mar Hall enclosure is a small, horse-shoe shaped enclosure appearing in southern Scotland, and was excavated in 2007. Mar Hall was an enclosure site predicted to have been formed within the Bronze Age. It appears certain that activity took place within the inner-ring grooves of the enclosure, and was likely not used for domestic practises due to its lack of diagnostic material.

=== The Iron Age (1200 - 550 bce) ===
==== Banjo Enclosures ====
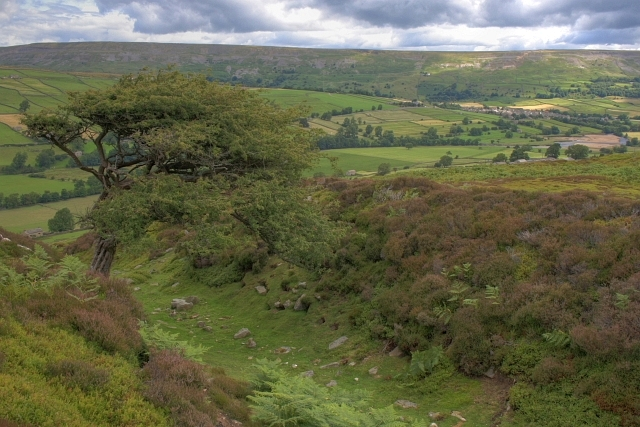
Maiden Castle. An Iron Age banjo enclosure possibly dating back to 600BC. Note the long, 110 meter neck of the enclosure.

Banjo enclosures are a prominent enclosure type found commonly in the British Middle Iron Age. They are characterised by their small, sub-circular outline, and single entrance, and usually connect to a wider field or paddock. The rounded enclosure is usually bound by a lake or something of the sorts, often resembling a banjo. They are not strongly understood or dated; however, it is evident they were originated during the Iron Age. The use of these enclosures is speculated to be for stock control and containment, rather than being for defensive and military use. It is also thought that the enclosures may have served as high-status occupation sites. The majority of Banjo enclosures are discovered through aerial photography and ground-penetrating radar imaging. Due to their earthwork, they are not expected to remain stable over time.
