= Dowsborough =

Hillfort in Somerset

Dowsborough Camp
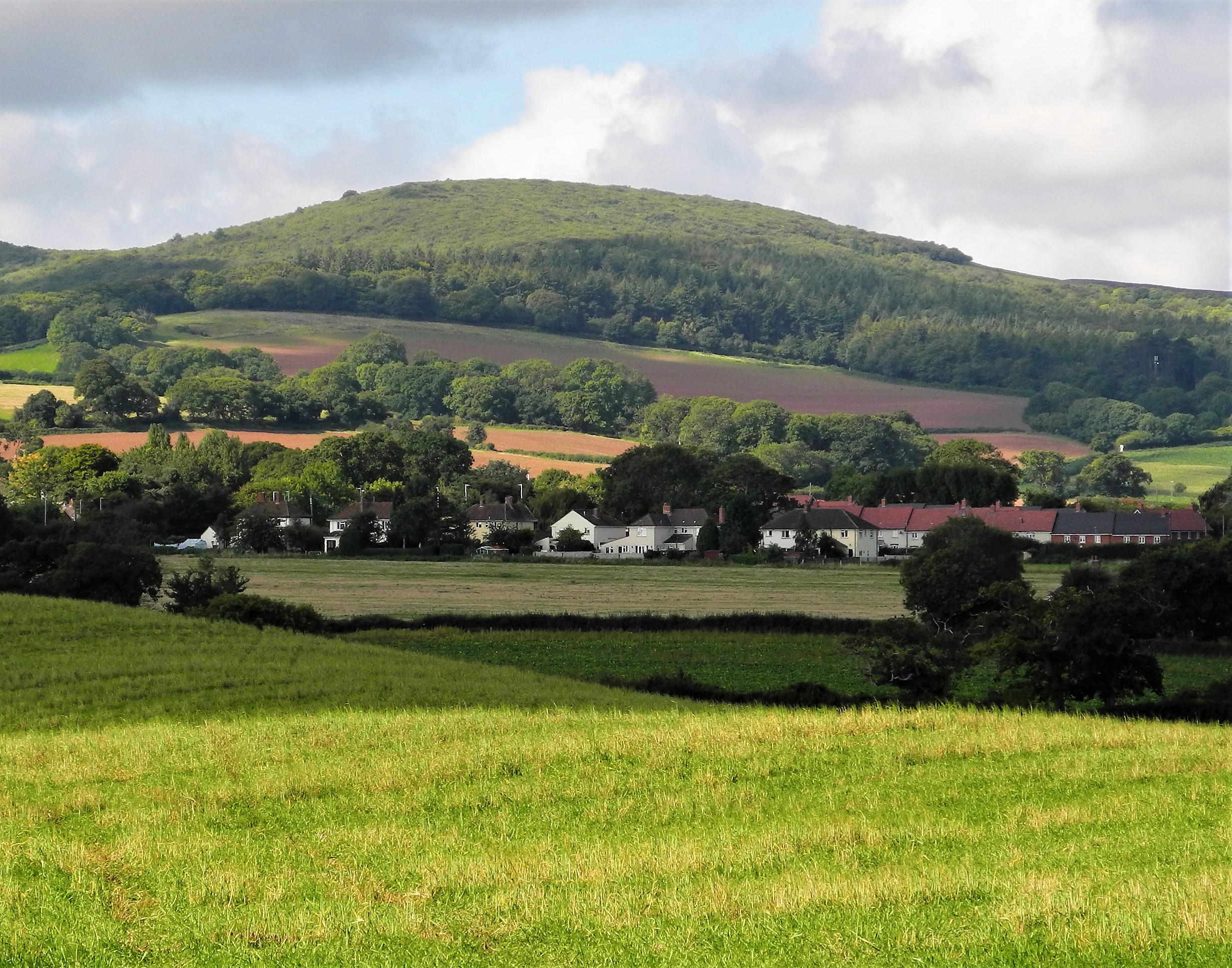
- Seen from just north of Nether Stowey.
- Interactive map of Dowsborough Camp
- 51°8′43.56″N 3°12′5.42″W
- Type: Hill fort
- Periods: Iron Age
- Location: near Nether Stowey
- Region: Somerset, England

Site notes
- Condition: some damage

Scheduled monument
- Official name: Dowsborough hillfort and associated round barrow
- Designated: 19 December 1929
- Reference no.: 1010494

Dowsborough Camp (or Danesborough or Dawesbury) is an Iron Age hill fort on the Quantock Hills near Nether Stowey in Somerset, England. It has been designated as a Scheduled Monument. The fort and associated round barrow has been added to the Heritage at Risk Register due to vulnerability to vehicle damage and erosion.

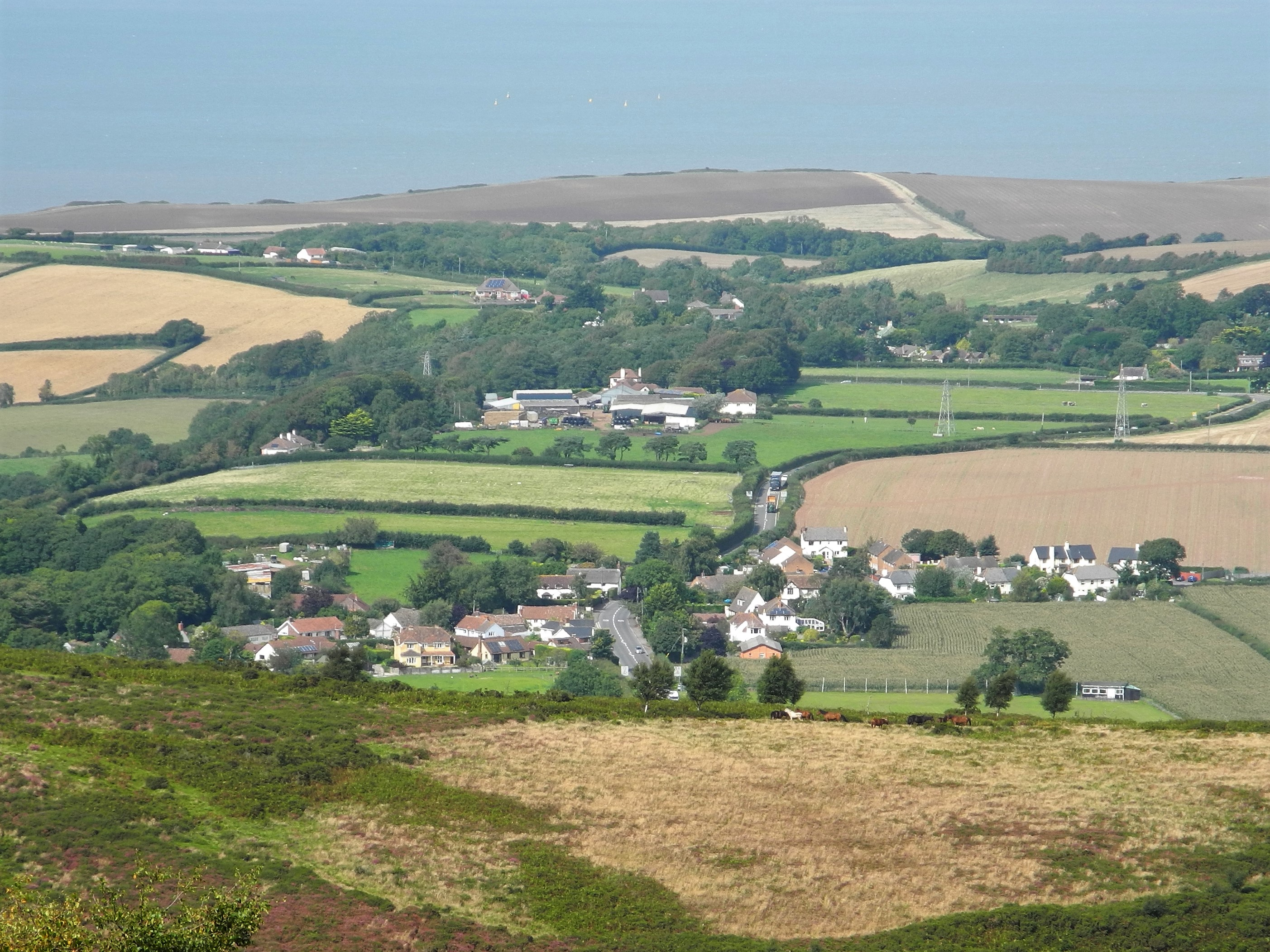
View north from the summit towards the Bristol Channel, the village of Holford is in view.

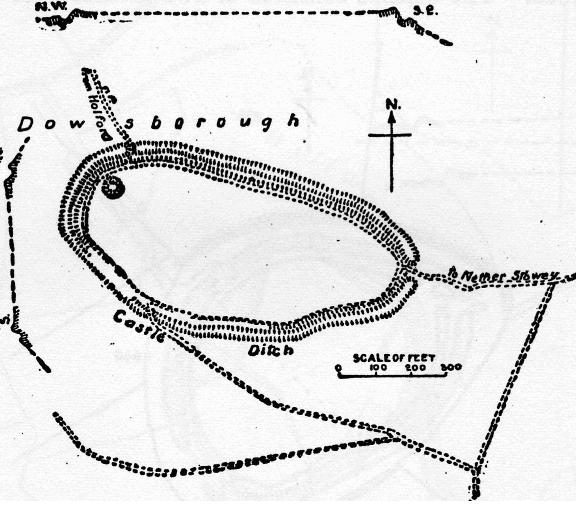
Earthworks at Dowsborough hill fort

== Situation ==
The site is at a height of 1115' (340 metres) on an easterly spur from the main Quantock ridge, with views north to the Bristol Channel, and east over the valley of the River Parrett.

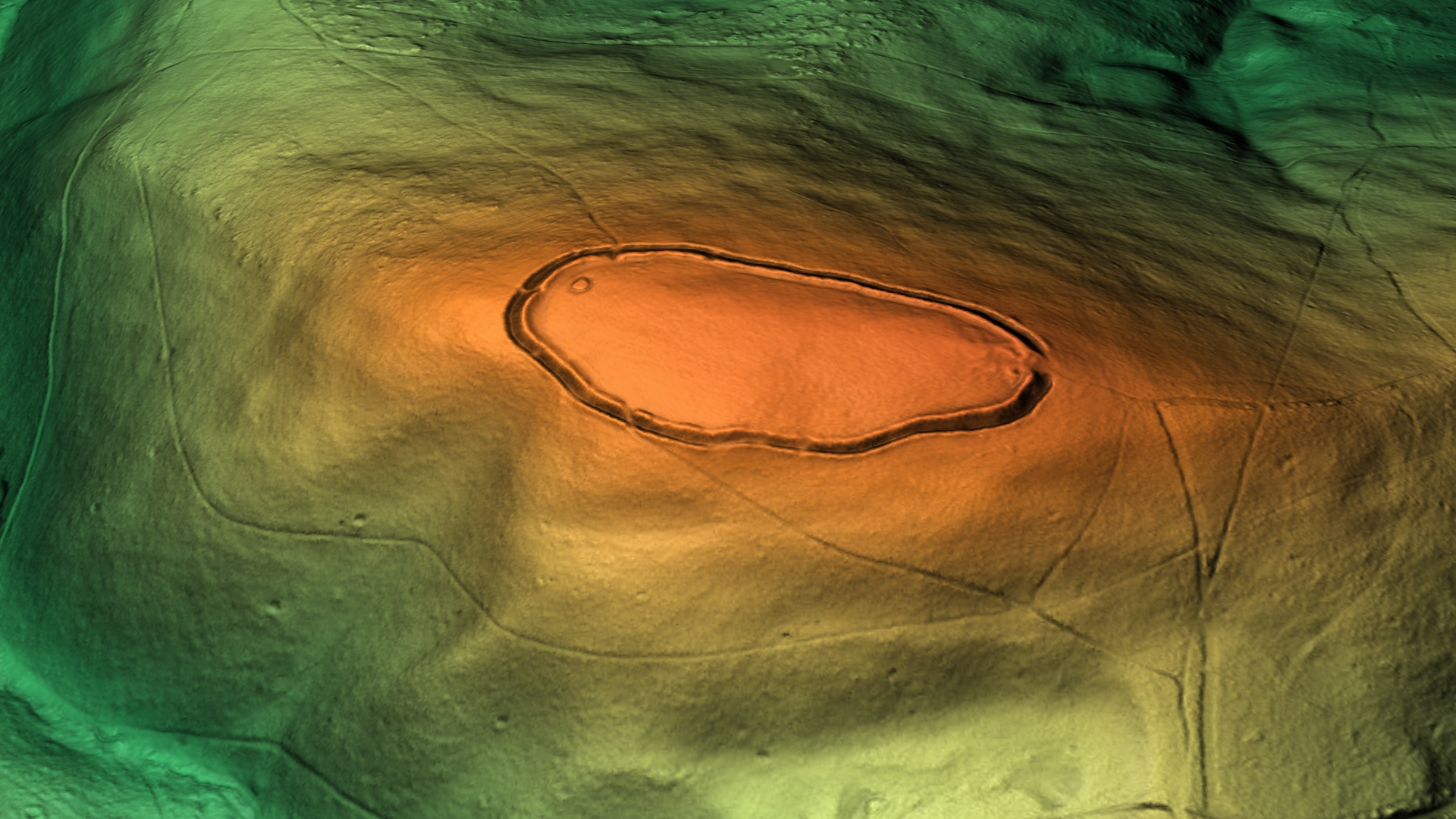
3D view of the digital terrain model

The fort has an oval shape, with a single rampart and ditch (univallate) following the contours of the hill top, enclosing an area of 6¾ acres (2.7 hectares). The main entrance is to the east, towards Nether Stowey, with a simpler opening to the north-west, aligned with a ridgeway leading down to Holford. The Lady's Fountain springs are in the combe to the west. A col to the south connects the hill to the main Stowey ridge, where a linear earthwork known as Dead Woman's Ditch cuts across the spur. This additional rampart would have provided an extra line of defence against attack from the main Quantock ridge to the west, and it could have been a tribal boundary.

== Saxon era ==
In Saxon times, King Alfred's military road, the Herepath, ran up from Combwich, Cannington (a possible site of the Battle of Cynwit) and Over Stowey, along the present course of the Stowey road, across Dead Woman's Ditch to Crowcombe Park Gate, south along the main ridge of the Quantocks to Triscombe Stone, then west across the valley to the Brendon Hills and Exmoor. The road connected a series of forts and lookout posts, which allowed Alfred's armies to move along the coast to cover Viking movements at sea and forestall any raids ashore. The path from Dowsborough to the Herepath is called Great Bear Path, and this is taken to be a corruption of Great Herepath, which suggests that Dowsborough could have been a Saxon lookout over the Bristol Channel.

== See also ==
- Ruborough
- Trendle Ring
- Plainsfield Camp
- Herepath
- List of hillforts and ancient settlements in Somerset
- Hillforts in Britain
- Hillfort
