= Dheena (disambiguation) =

Dheena is a 2001 Indian Tamil-language film starring Ajith Kumar.

Dheena may also refer to:

- Dhina or Dheena, Indian music composer
- Dheena (actor), Indian television personality
- Dheena Chandra Dhas, Indian voice actor
- RJ Dheena, Indian radio jockey
- Sai Dheena, Indian actor

== See also ==
- Deena (disambiguation)
- Dina (disambiguation)
- Deen (disambiguation)
- Din (disambiguation)
- Dhin, town in Punjab, India
