= Dina Dam =

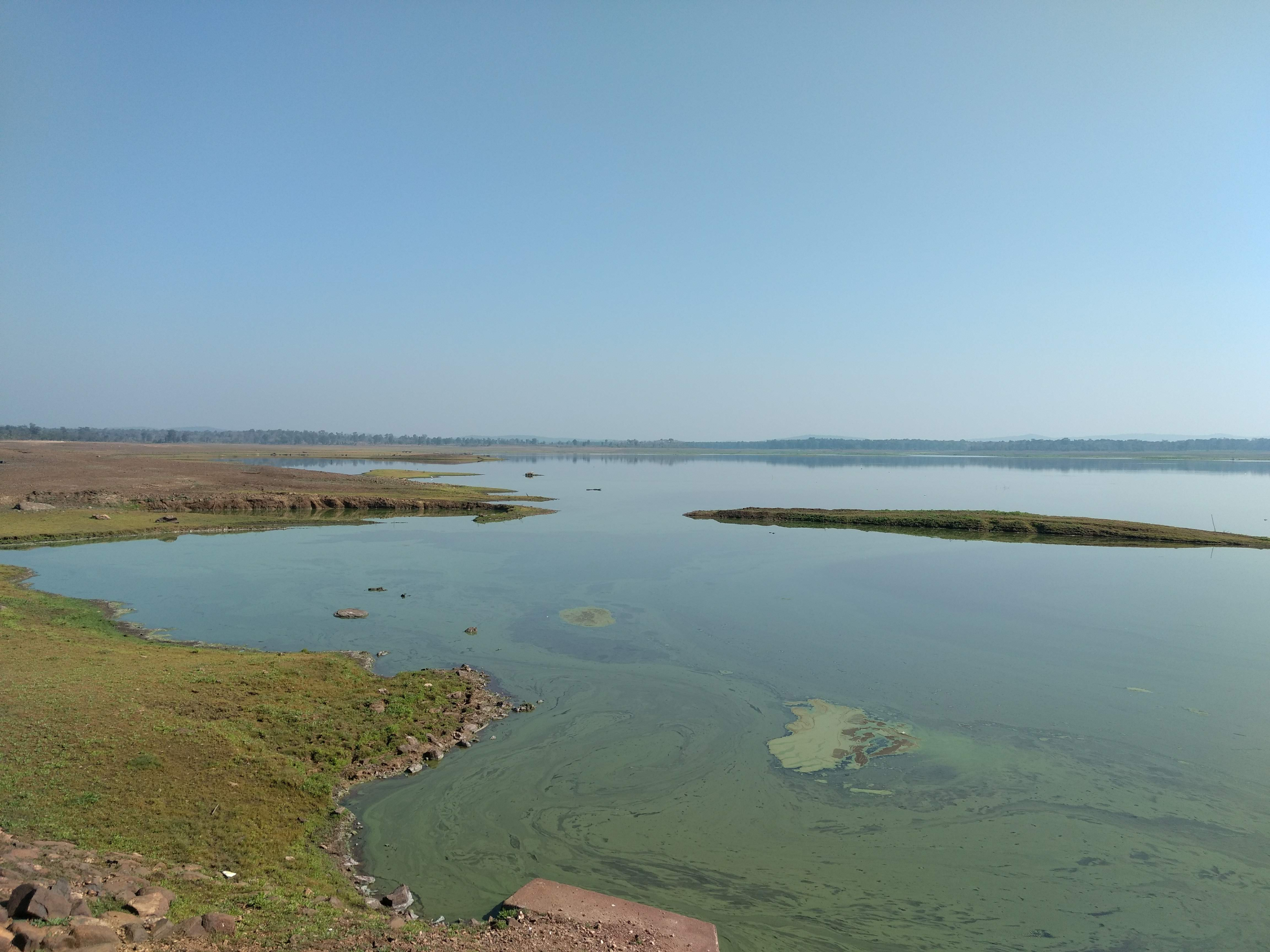

- Location within Maharashtra
- Official name: Dina Dam D01326
- Location: Charmoshi
- Coordinates: 19.7542334°N 80.1282283°E
- Opening date: 1974
- Owners: Government of Maharashtra, India

Dam and spillways
- Type of dam: Earthfill
- Impounds: Dina river
- Height: 21.49 m (70.5 ft)
- Length: 3,137 m (10,292 ft)
- Dam volume: 957 km^{3} (230 cu mi)

Reservoir
- Total capacity: 55,940 km^{3} (13,420 cu mi)
- Surface area: 13,765 km^{2} (5,315 sq mi)

Dina Dam, is an earthfill dam on the Dina river near Chamorshi, Gadchiroli district in the state of Maharashtra in India.

== Specifications ==
The height of the dam above lowest foundation is 21.49 m (70.5 ft) while the length is 3,137 m (10,292 ft). The volume content is 957 km^{3} (230 cu mi) and gross storage capacity is 61,150.00 km^{3} (14,670.67 cu mi).

== Purpose ==
- Irrigation

== See also ==
- Dams in Maharashtra
- List of reservoirs and dams in India
