= Dinas =

Dinas may refer to:

== Places ==
=== England ===
- Dinas, an area of Padstow, Cornwall
- Castle an Dinas, St Columb Major, an Iron Age hillfort at the summit of Castle Downs, Cornwall
- Treryn Dinas, a headland near Treen, on the Penwith peninsula, Cornwall
- Trereen Dinas, an Iron Age promontory fort at Gurnard's Head, Cornwall

=== Wales ===
- Dinas, Gwynedd, a large hamlet near Bontnewydd, Caernarfon
  - Dinas railway station, on the narrow gauge Welsh Highland Railway
  - Dinas (FR) railway station, disused Festiniog Railway station
- Dinas Cross, a village and community in Pembrokeshire
  - Dinas Island, (Ynys Dinas) a peninsula in the community of Dinas Cross
- Dinas Dinlle, a small settlement in Gwynedd
- Dinas Emrys, a hillock near Beddgelert, Gwynedd
- Dinas Mawddwy, a town and community in Gwynedd
- Dinas Powys, a village and community in the Vale of Glamorgan
  - Dinas Powys railway station
  - Dinas Powys hillfort
- Dinas Rhondda, a village near Tonypandy, Rhondda Cynon Taf
  - Dinas Rhondda railway station
- Castell Dinas, a hillfort and castle in southern Powys
- Llyn Dinas, a lake near Beddgelert, Gwynedd
- Pen Dinas, a large hill in Penparcau, on the coast of Ceredigion

=== Philippines ===
- Dinas, Zamboanga del Sur, a municipality

== People ==
- Arley Dinas (born 1974), a former Colombian football player
- Thanasis Dinas (born 1989), Greek footballer

== Other uses ==
- Dinas (weevil), a beetle genus in the tribe Sciaphilini
