= Enclosed cremation cemetery =

Archaeology term

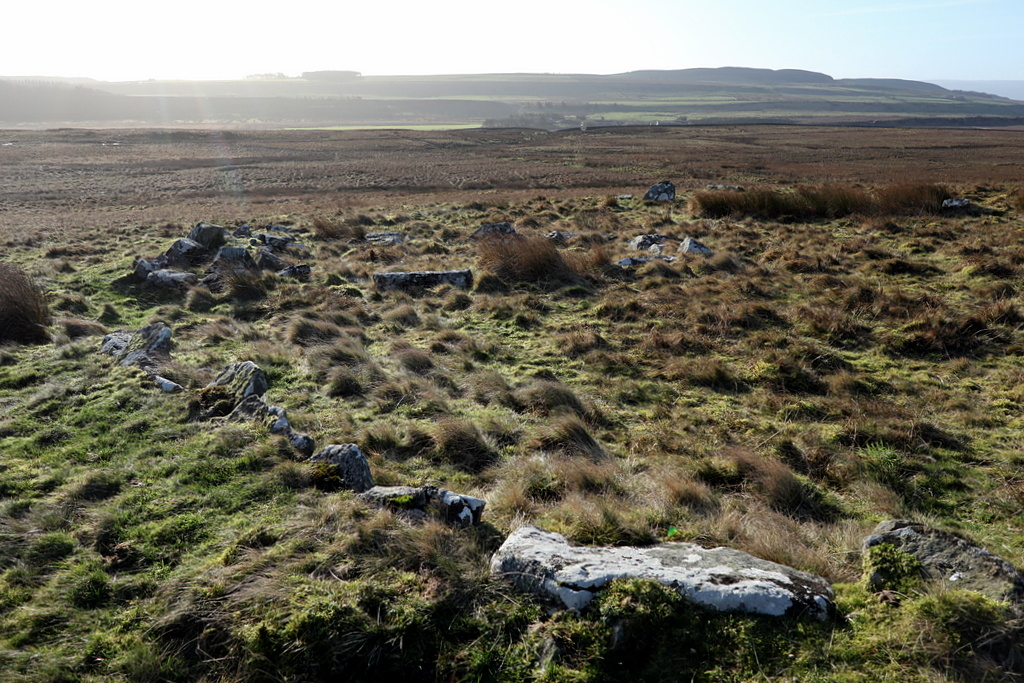
Enclosed cremation cemetery near Chatley Crags.

Enclosed cremation cemetery is a term used by archaeologists to describe a type of cemetery found in north western Europe during the late Neolithic and early Bronze Age.

== Description ==
Enclosed cremation cemeteries are similar to urnfield burial grounds in that they consist of a concentration of pits containing cremated remains which have usually also been placed into pottery vessels. However they are also surrounded by a circular or oval bank and outer ditch which gives them their name.

== Example sites ==
The most famous example is Stonehenge which functioned as such a cemetery during its early use when it was a simple earthwork enclosure. Its status has been questioned as its not clear that that was its only use at the time.

== Interpretation ==
Enclosed cremation cemeteries are interpreted as being variations on the ritual and funerary practice of enclosing significant sites of activity during the period, also exhibited by henges and stone circles.
