= Dhin =

- Census town
- Location in Punjab, India Dhin (India)
- Coordinates: 31.262818°N 75.6028401°E
- Country: India
- State: Punjab
- District: Jalandhar

Government
  - Type: Panchayat raj
  - Body: Gram panchayat
- Elevation: 240 m (790 ft)

Population (2011)
  - Total: 5,961
- Sex ratio 3092/2869 ♂/♀

Languages
  - Official: Punjabi
- Time zone: UTC+5:30 (IST)
- ISO 3166 code: IN-PB
- Vehicle registration: PB- 08
- Website: jalandhar.nic.in

Dhin is a census town in Jalandhar district of Punjab State, India. It is located 9 kilometres (5.6 mi) from Jalandhar, 20 kilometres (12 mi) from Phagwara, 54 kilometres (34 mi) from district headquarter Hoshiarpur and 147 kilometres (91 mi) from state capital Chandigarh. The village is administrated by a sarpanch who is an elected representative of village as per Panchayati raj (India).

== Transport ==
Jalandhar city railway station is the nearest train station. The village is 72 kilometres (45 mi) away from domestic airport in Ludhiana and the nearest international airport is located in Chandigarh also Sri Guru Ram Dass Jee International Airport is the second nearest airport which is 105 kilometres (65 mi) away in Amritsar.

== See also ==
- List of villages in India
