= Dinas Powys hillfort =

Hillfort in the Vale of Glamorgan, Wales

Coordinates: 51.4430°N 3.2268°W

The Dinas Powys hillfort is an Iron Age hillfort near Dinas Powys, Glamorgan, Wales. It is just one of several thousand hillforts to have been constructed around Great Britain during the British Iron Age, for reasons that are still debatable. The main fort at Dinas Powys was constructed on the northernmost point of the hill in either the third or 2nd century BCE, with two further constructs, known as the Southern Banks, being built further down on the southern end of the hill in the following 1st century BCE. It appears that occupation at the site ceased during the period of Roman Britain, but was re-inhabited by the time of Sub-Roman Britain in the 5th century CE, who constructed further additions to the fort. The site was subsequently excavated by a team of archaeologists led by Leslie Alcock from 1954 through to 1958.

The hillfort, which was called the dinas (city or fortress) by Welsh speaking locals, is probably the reason the neighbouring village was named Dinas Powys, and archaeologists excavating the site in the mid 20th century decided to rename the hillfort after the settlement, with excavator Leslie Alcock remarking that "it therefore seemed appropriate by a kind of back-formation to restore the village name to [the fortifications]".

== History ==
Dinas Powys hillfort is located on the eastern end of the Vale of Glamorgan, a county borough at the southernmost tip of Wales that geologically comprises predominantly Lias limestone in the south and Carboniferous limestone in the north. The eastern end in particular "is dissected into flat-topped, steep-sided ridges and hills by deep and narrow river valleys, so that in detail the relief of the south-east Glamorgan is a tangle of minor [landscape] features." The hillfort was constructed on one such of these geographical features, a whale-back hill that is just over a quarter of a mile in length. The fort was built on the northerly tip of the whale-back hill, the highest and narrowest point of the vicinity. It had "no visible defences; but on the west side there is a single bank, on the east two banks, while the southern approach is barred by no fewer than four ramparts." It was located near to the harbour at the estuary of the River Ely, which would have been an important entry point for trade in later prehistory: there is certainly evidence for its use as a harbour in the Early and Middle Bronze Age, several centuries prior to the hillfort's initial construction.

=== Iron Age and Romano-British periods ===
Phase One at the Dinas Powys site, which comprised purely of the hillfort on the northernmost tip of the hill, began construction during the Iron Age, at some point in the third or 2nd century BCE. It was evidently settled by a community at this time, as is evidenced by large quantities of Iron Age pottery at the site. There are also several postholes that have been excavated inside the fort, indicating that there may well have been buildings constructed inside of it at this period. Phase Two of Dinas Powys began construction in the Late Iron Age, during the 1st century BCE, and saw the building of the two Southern Banks, which were located on the southern end of the hill, away from the main fort. According to excavator Leslie Alcock, these two defences did not appear to have ever been completed, for instance there was no evidence that a gateway was ever built between them, something which would have meant the banks were of little use in a defensive situation.

Throughout much of the 20th century, archaeologists thought that hillforts were constructed to be defensive structures in a society that was dominated by warfare, or the threat of warfare between different tribal groups. Indeed, excavator Leslie Alcock remarked that the main Dinas Powys fort was "heavily defended", but that the Southern Banks were far less defensible.

In the 1st century CE, southern Britain was conquered and absorbed into the Roman Empire, leading to the period of Roman Britain, when Roman and native Iron Age British culture merged into something Romano-British. This period would last until the 4th century, when the Roman armies left Britain. During this period, the Vale of Glamorgan saw "intensive settlement", with the construction of at least three Roman villas in the local area, each presumably with its own agricultural estate. During this Romano-British period, it is debatable whether the Dinas Powys hillfort continued to be occupied, for no major features were constructed on the site, and only a small amount of Romano-British artefacts have been uncovered there, whereas other local settlement sites in the Vale of Glamorgan contain far greater quantities of Romano-British artefacts. As Alcock noted, "Seen in its local context, the Phase 3 [i.e. Romano-British] material can scarcely amount to a Romano-British occupation of the site."

=== Early Mediaeval period ===
==== Settlement and subsistence ====
"[W]e interpret [Dinas Powys] as the Ilys or court of a local ruler, with its neuadd or hall (House I) surrounded by subsidiary buildings of stone and timber and forming the centre of a variety of agricultural, industrial, and domestic pursuits."

— Leslie Alcock, archaeologist (1963).

A new period of occupation at the hillfort began in the post-Roman, Early Mediaeval era, that which the excavators referred to as the "Early Christian period". Dating to the 5th and 6th centuries CE, this saw the construction of Phase Four of the site, which saw at least two buildings, possibly made out of stone rather than wood, being built within the fort. Archaeologists interpreted one of these, House I, as being a hall that was lived in by the local lord and his family, whilst House II "was probably therefore a store-house or barn, though it is not improbable that servants or labourers and their families slept there."

Phase Four also saw the construction of a number of hearths within the fort, some of which "were industrial rather than domestic", suggesting that the site was being used for production of metal goods as well as, or rather than settlement. Examining the remnants of these hearths, excavators came to the conclusion that there was both a blacksmith and a jeweller active on the site, and that these skilled craftsmen were likely migrants from Ireland who had come to the area looking for work, where the lord of Dinas Powys had employed them.

It was amongst some of these hearths that excavators found the burial of a human child approximately five years old, which they believe dates to this period, and that "Slight though the grave was, the body had obviously been laid out with care. It recalls the burials found within, or immediately adjacent to, Romano-British settlements, and clearly looks back to native, pre-Christian traditions" despite probably being a Christian burial. There was also much refuse produced by the Early Mediaeval individuals living at the fort, leading to the depositing of this rubbish in several large rubbish pits (middens) along the eastern end of the site; the sheer volume of this rubbish led Alcock to state in 1963 that it was "the largest assemblage of Early Christian material so far recovered in Wales and the Marches."

"To judge from the archaeological material which has been recovered, the main basis of the Dinas Powys economy [in the Early Mediaeval] was stock-raising", primarily of cattle and sheep. Unusually for the area however, it appears from the excavated animal bones that most of the livestock was slaughtered before they were capable of reproduction, something indicating that – with the exception of the pigs – the numbers of livestock would not be sustainable unless new imports were being regularly brought in from elsewhere. As well as eating such meat, the inhabitants of Dinas Powys hillfort apparently ate bread, as rotary querns used for grinding grain, likely locally grown, were found at the site. "A subsidiary role in the Dinas Powys economy was played by metalworking", and it was the produce from both the livestock and metalworking that the elite traded in order to gain access to luxury goods – such as wine, oil and pottery – from elsewhere around the Irish Sea and even from southern Europe.

==== Defence ====
There was also apparently attempts to build further defences for the site in this period, as archaeologists believe that one of the ditches and banks around the site, which they referred to as Ditch II and Bank II, were constructed in this century, because they "differ significantly" from the other ditches and banks (which are known to be Late Mediaeval in date), being poorly constructed in comparison to them. Excavator Leslie Alcock remarked on the relatively poor defensive qualities of the hillfort during the 5th century, remarking that:

The slightness of these defences may seem out of keeping with the evidence to be adduced for the richness and importance of Dinas Powys in the Early Christian period, but is not inconsistent with other evidence from Welsh sites defended in late [fourth] and succeeding centuries. As Dinas Emrys, for instance, a position of great natural strength was chosen, but the defensive wall was only some 8 to 10 feet wide. At Carreg-y-Ilam the enclosure walls had similar dimensions.

=== Late Mediaeval period ===
Following the Norman invasion of Wales, in which the Norman-dominated English monarchy occupied Wales, it appears that Dinas Powys continued to be used. The Norman phase of construction and settlement, which took place in the 11th and 12th centuries CE, and which is known as Phase 5, involved the construction of Banks 1, 3 and 4, greatly making the site more defensive. As Alcock noted, "The defences of Phase 5 were clearly well contrived and laboriously constructed." A further wave of construction, known as Phase 6, took place later in the Norman era. Remarking as to the fort's usage in this period, which saw further defensification, Alcock noted that the "more likely explanation is that the Dinas Powys ring-work was not a fortified residence; it was a military strong-point, occupied only at times of need, perhaps by a tented garrison".

=== Modern period ===
In the 19th century, the hillfort appeared on the first edition of the Ordnance Survey's one-inch map, where it was referred to as Beili Castell, a name which, according to Alcock, "appears to have no real justification." It was subsequently omitted from several later OS maps.

== Excavation ==
The excavations at Dinas Powys hillfort.

The first time that archaeologists took an interest in the monument was in 1913, when it was referred to as "a British camp in the woods of Cwrt-yr-Alta" by a Mrs H. Lewis in a 1913 edition of the Archaeologica Cambrensis. The noted archaeologist Mortimer Wheeler, who would later go on to excavate the prominent hillfort of Maiden Castle, Dorset, then referred to the Dinas Powys site in the 1921–23 Bulletin of the newly founded Board of Celtic Studies. Wheeler himself took a particular interest in the monument, producing the first accurate plan of the fort for the National Museum of Wales.

An actual project designed to excavate the hillfort was developed by professors at the newly founded archaeology department of University College, Cardiff in the mid-1950s. In 1953, archaeologists Sir Cyril Fox, Dr V.E. Nash-Williams and Dr H.N. Savoy examined a variety of sites in southern Wales to decide which would be the best training site for the university's students, and eventually came to the conclusion that the Dinas Powys hillfort would be best. After gaining permission to excavate from Sir Herbert Merrett of the Cwrt-yr-Ala Estate Company and the Forestry Commission (the owners and tenants of the land respectively), and getting a small monetary grant from the Board of Celtic Studies, excavation began in January 1954. The excavations continued for four years, till 1958, mostly at weekends in spring and early summer, and also at Easter from 1954 through to 1957, and during July–August 1958. Following the financial support of the Board of Celtic Studies, grants were later made for the excavation by Glamorgan County Council, the Cambrian Archaeological Association, the British Academy, the Haverfield Trustees and the Society of Antiquaries. Most of the work was undertaken by volunteers, namely students from University College Cardiff, as well as from community archaeological societies both from Wales and from the rest of Britain. For the back-filling however, manual workmen were employed due to the more physical nature of the labour. The excavators decided to leave certain areas unexcavated, stating that "Sufficient areas have been left unexcavated for future workers to have some chance of testing both the observation of facts and the hypotheses presented [in their conclusions]."

One of the head excavators, Leslie Alcock subsequently published a book on the hillfort, entitled Dinas Powys: An Iron Age, Dark Age and Early Medieval Settlement in Glamorgan, through the University of Wales Press in 1963. One reviewer of Alcock's work, P.V. Addyman, writing in the Ulster Journal of Archaeology, remarked that the book, which was "excellently produced by the University Press, goes beyond the normal scope of an excavation report and reviews the considerable implications of these discoveries; implications which, in the Dark Age phases at least, affect the whole of the Irish Sea culture province."

== See also ==
- List of hillforts in Wales
