= Dina (surname) =

Dina is the surname of:

- Márton Dina (born 1996), Hungarian professional cyclist
- Mihai Dina (born 1985), Romanian footballer
- Pavol Diňa (born 1963), Slovak football coach and former player
- Tith Dina (born 1993), Cambodian footballer
- Yossi Dina (born 1954), Israeli pawnbroker, businessman, entrepreneur and reality television personality
