= Herepath =

Military road

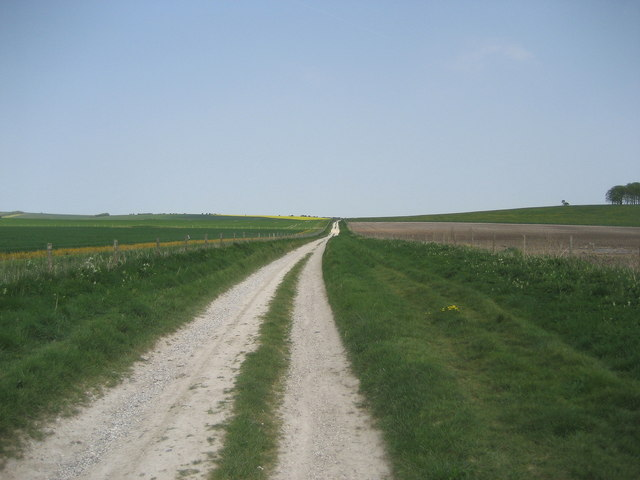
Herepath near Avebury, Wiltshire

A herepath or hereweg is a military road (literally, an army path) in England, typically dating from the ninth century AD.

This was a time of war between the Anglo-Saxon kingdoms of southern England and Viking invaders from Denmark. The English military preparations, conducted under the leadership of King Alfred of Wessex, included fortified burhs or places of refuge and connecting herepaths using existing routes or new works. As superior or safer roads, sometimes following ridgeway routes, herepaths were intensely used by ordinary travellers and hauliers. Where these roads exist today, local legend often imputes them with magical, romantic or mystical origins in prehistoric time and the name is rather wantonly applied to any old trackway, especially in the region of Wessex.

In the Old English language the word here means "armed host". It is also found as a prefix in compound words such as harbour (a burh with a garrison) and heretoga (a militia leader). The term herepath has cognates in other Germanic languages in forms such as Heerweg (German) and Hærvejen (Danish). In all three languages, a herepath in later times simply denotes a road that was a via publica, maintained at central government expense.
