= Plainsfield Camp =

Iron Age earthwork in Somerset, England

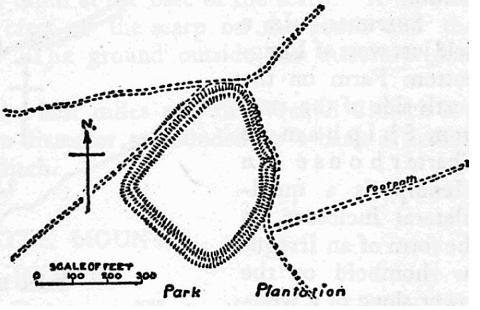
- Plan of earthworks at Plainsfield Camp, Park Plantation

- Location within Somerset
- 51°07′11″N 3°10′12″W
- Location: Aisholt in Somerset, England

History
- Built: Iron Age

Site notes
- Area: 0.9 hectares (2.2 acres)

Scheduled monument
- Reference no.: 189501

Plainsfield Camp (or Park Plantation or Cockercombe Castle) is a possible Iron Age earthwork on the Quantock Hills near Aisholt in Somerset, England.

The so-called hill fort has several features that make it more likely to be an animal enclosure than a defended settlement:

- single rampart with ditch
- simple opening for an entrance
- situated on the slope of a hill
- the hill rises over 50 m above the ring
- the area is only 0.9 hectares (2.2 acres)

The case for an enclosure is less clear cut than for Trendle Ring, since Plainsfield is on a spur and does have steep slopes on two sides, making it like a promontory fort, similar to nearby Ruborough.

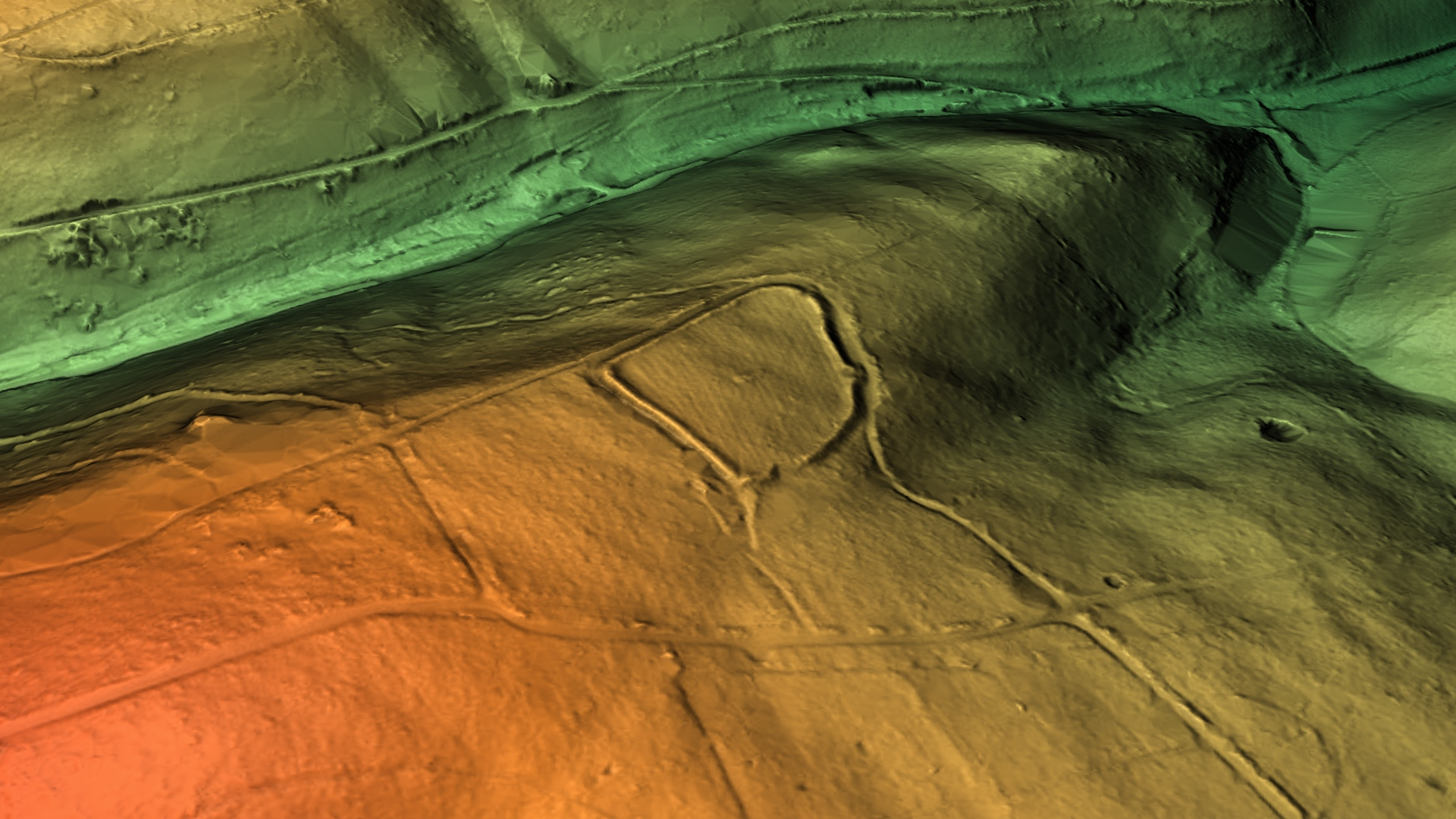
3D view of the digital terrain model

It is a Scheduled Ancient Monument.

== Background ==
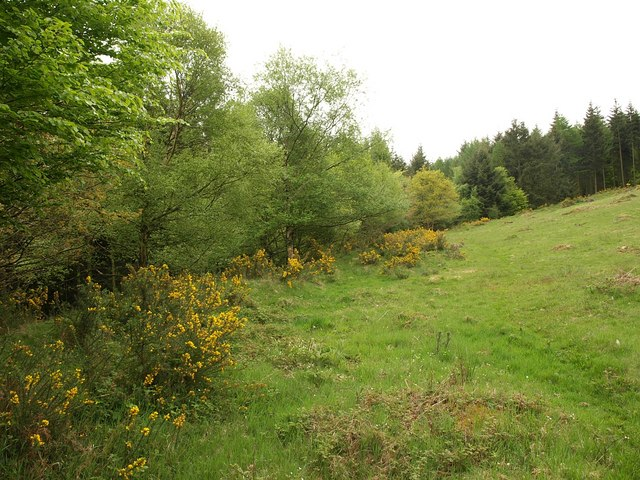
Plainsfield Camp

Hill forts developed in the Late Bronze and Early Iron Age, roughly during the start of the first millennium BC. The reason for their emergence in Britain, as well as their purpose, has been a subject of debate. It has been argued that they could have been military sites constructed in response to invasions from continental Europe, sites built by invaders, or a military reaction to social tensions caused by an increasing population and consequent pressure on agriculture. The dominant view since the 1960s has been that the increasing use of iron led to social changes in Britain. Deposits of iron ore were located in different places to the tin and copper ore necessary to make bronze; as a result, trading patterns shifted and the old elites lost their economic and social status. Power passed into the hands of a new group of people. Archaeologist Barry Cunliffe believes that population increase still played a role and has stated that "[the forts] provided defensive possibilities for the community at those times when the stress [of an increasing population] burst out into open warfare. But I wouldn't see them as having been built because there was a state of war. They would be functional as defensive strongholds when there were tensions and undoubtedly some of them were attacked and destroyed, but this was not the only, or even the most significant, factor in their construction".

== See also ==
- Ruborough
- Dowsborough
- Trendle Ring
- List of hill forts and ancient settlements in Somerset
