= Dina River =

Coordinates: 19°28′N 79°57′E

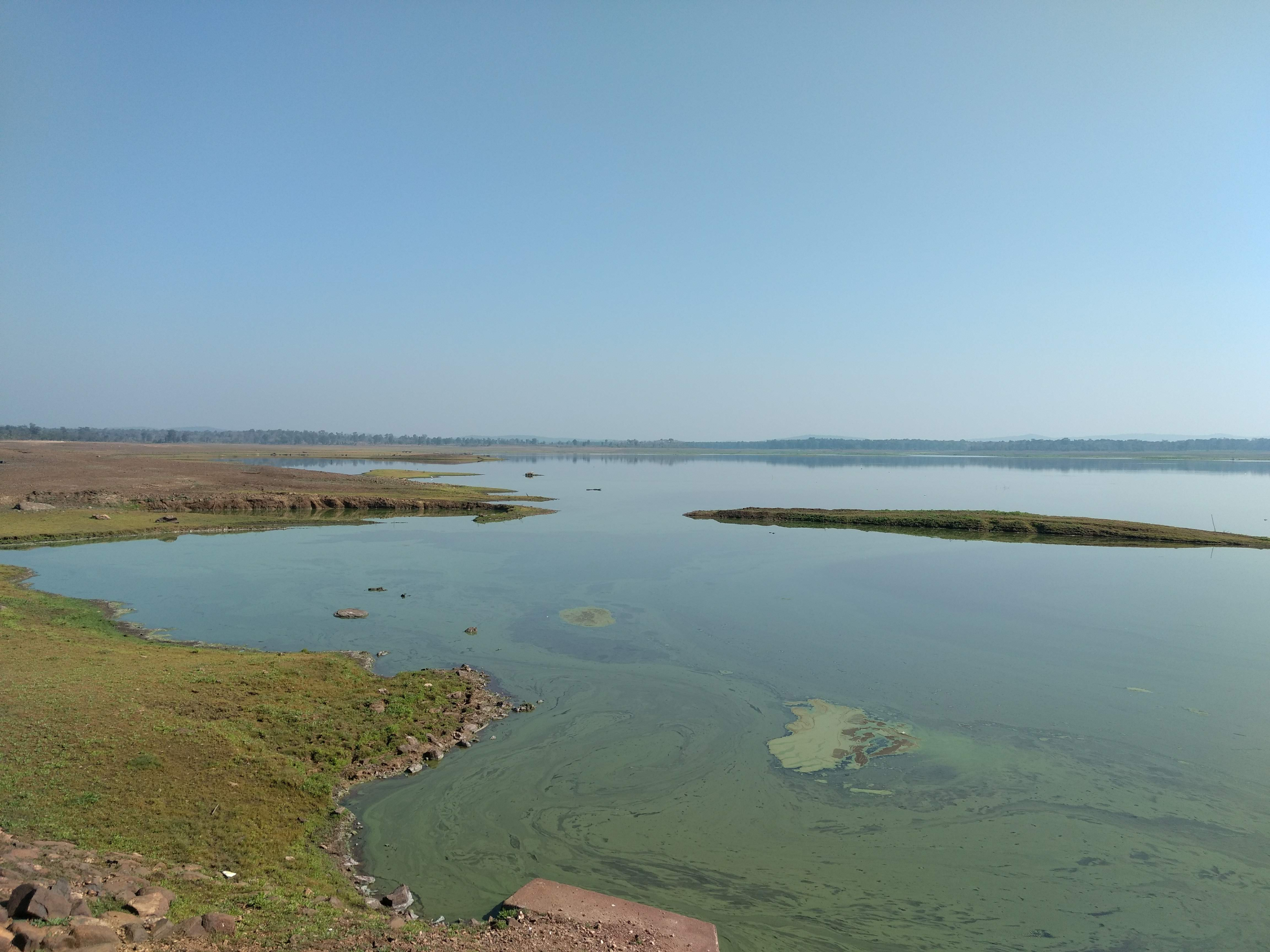
Backwaters of Dina dam at Regadi.

The Dina River is a river that runs near Chamorshi in the Gadchiroli district of Maharashtra, India. It joins Pranahita River near Wadlapeth in Aheri taluka. It is home to the Dina Dam. In September 2022, various villages in the backwater of the Dina dam lost connection due to floods.
