= DIN Is Noise =

- Original author: S. Jagannathan
- Developer: S. Jagannathan
- Stable release: 5.x / March 20, 2013; 12 years ago
- Written in: C++ and Tcl
- Operating system: Linux, OS X and Windows
- Type: Audio creation
- License: GNU General Public License v2, Proprietary license
- Website: www.dinisnoise.org

DIN (DIN Is Noise) is a software musical instrument for the Linux, Mac OS X and Windows operating systems. A DIN player either plays with a keyboard, or uses the computer mouse to pick both the pitch (by moving horizontally) and the volume (by moving vertically) of a sound from an on-screen keyboard that displays the notes of the current scale and a number of microtones in-between. By varying the mouse position, a player can simultaneously change the pitch & volume of their sound and improvise their music. Players can use Bézier curves to create and sculpt waveforms to change the timbre of the instrument, provide carrier and modulator waveforms for the FM and AM and control other parameters like stereo gater patterns, Delay feedback & volume patterns and Compressor patterns. Users can also create an unlimited number of drones pitched on any microtone and edit them in real-time.

DIN uses JACK to output audio on Linux and accepts input using MIDI, OSC & IRC protocols.

DIN is free software on Linux and proprietary software on Windows and Mac OS X.
