= Leslie Alcock =

British archaeologist

Leslie Alcock OBE FSA FSA Scot FRSE (24 April 1925 – 6 June 2006) was Professor of Archaeology at the University of Glasgow, and one of the leading archaeologists of Early Medieval Britain. His major excavations included Dinas Powys hill fort in Wales, Cadbury Castle in Somerset and a series of major hillforts in Scotland.

== Early years ==
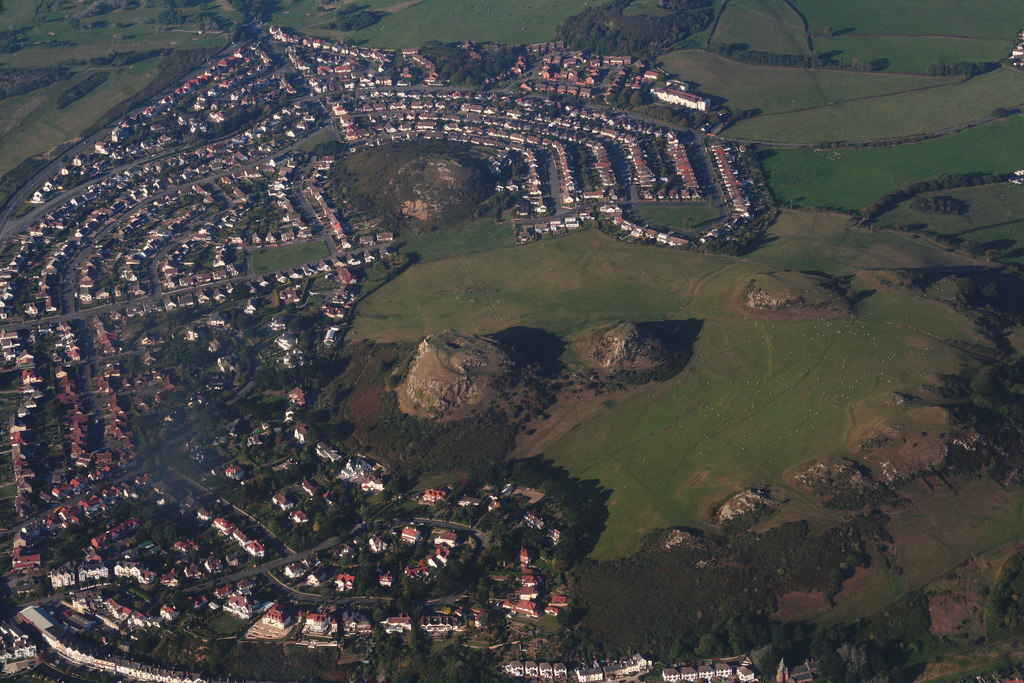
Alcock directed excavations at Deganwy Castle between 1961 and 1966.

Alcock was born at Cheadle Hulme, Stockport, near Manchester, son of clerk Philip John Alcock and Mary Ethel (née Bagley). He won a scholarship to Manchester Grammar School in 1935. Alcock left school in 1942, subsequently joining the army and going on to serve as a captain in the Royal Gurkha Rifles during World War II. After demobilisation in 1946, he won a scholarship to Brasenose College, Oxford, where he read Modern History from 1946 to 1949. He pursued his interest in archaeology through the Oxford Archaeology Society, becoming its president. He met his wife Elizabeth during this period, and they were married in 1950, shortly before he left Britain to become the first director of the Archaeological Survey of Pakistan. He had previously returned to the sub-continent to serve as Sir Mortimer Wheeler's deputy on the excavations at Mohenjo-daro. This relationship was to prove more valuable than the directorship of the survey, which he left after not being paid for several months. Back in Britain, a short stint as curator at the Abbey House Museum in Leeds in 1952 was followed by a post as a junior lecturer in the Department of Archaeology at Cardiff University. He was to remain in Cardiff for 20 years, rising to the level of Reader, and undertaking his major southern British excavations at Dînas Powys in Wales (Alcock 1963) and South Cadbury (Alcock 1972). During this period, Cardiff was to emerge as one of the powerhouses of archaeology in British universities, and many of the leading figures in British archaeology today encountered Alcock as a teacher at that time.

== Cadbury ==
The excavation at Cadbury Castle, South Cadbury, made Alcock's name. The hillfort had a traditional link with Camelot and the Arthurian legends, and Alcock made sure that the media were aware of his work. The five seasons of the excavations were widely reported, making Alcock into one of the better known British archaeologists of the time. His methodology made headlines within the archaeological community with his use of geophysical survey, which at that time before its prominent use by archaeological television programme Time Team was an unusual and experimental process; while he also preferred the use of open-area excavation to the Wheeler method that held sway at the time.

Alcock's sense of humour also came out during the excavations. He had a good understanding of what visitors to the site wanted to see, so he had a plastic skeleton excavated from the same spot every afternoon, with a bucket beside the trench to take donations for the diggers' welfare fund. The money was used to the benefit of the local economy each evening in the pub.

The results of the excavation were impressive. The earliest identifiable occupation on the hill was Early and Late Neolithic. After an apparent hiatus during the earlier Bronze Age it was reoccupied in the centuries around 1000BC, remaining so continuously until at least the first century AD. His excavations produced scant evidence for Roman occupation, aside from a barracks block of the latter first century but demonstrated that it was the largest reoccupied fortified hilltop in post-Roman Britain. He also identified Late Saxon refurbishment of the defences and a foundation trench for a probable cruciform church, apparently never completed but intended to meet the needs of moneyers moved to the hill for security during the early 11th century AD.

Alcock was able to tell evocative stories of the history of the fort, and particularly of its fate during the Roman period, where there was clear evidence of a violent attack on the fort. However, the scale of the material recovered meant that his publication of the site (Alcock 1972) was really a large scale interim report. Final publication waited until 1995 for the early medieval material, which he published himself in 1995 (Alcock 1995), and 2000 for the earlier material (Barrett et al. 2000). The main drawback for Alcock was that he had now become irrevocably connected with Arthur in the minds of the public.

From 1994, until his death in 2006 Alcock was patron of the South Cadbury Environs Project, a programme of research exploring the landscape around the hillfort.

== Later career ==
The publicity from the South Cadbury excavations meant that Alcock was one of Britain's best known archaeologists in the early 1970s. This was reflected in 1973, when he was appointed to the newly established Chair of Archaeology at University of Glasgow. This was an opportunity to re-focus his archaeological direction, and to build a new department. The latter was achieved by the appointment of promising young talent alongside more established colleagues; these younger academics currently hold senior positions in British universities.

The former opportunity was realised by moving away from Arthur to look at the Dark Age sites of Scotland. At this time, the Dark Ages were darker for Scotland than for England because of the paucity of written records for Scotland in the period and the lack of clearly Dark Age sites. Some had been identified in earlier work, but virtually nothing was known about this important period of Scotland's past. His changing focus can be seen with a review of Pictish settlements (Alcock 1980), but his manifesto for his new research trajectory came in a publication looking at hillforts across Britain (Alcock 1981), although he had been working on this trajectory from 1973 (Alcock & Alcock 1992, 216). In this paper, Alcock listed the centres of political power named in the various annals relating to Scotland in this period; these annals were all from outwith Scotland and were mainly Irish. Having named the important sites, he then set out to link the placename with a particular archaeological site.

In some cases, he was able to show a good degree of confidence in the identification; in others, he was less sure and later changed his mind, such as with Urquhart Castle, which he downgraded from Bridei mac Maelchon's fort to the fort of a Pictish noble mentioned in Adomnán's Life of Columba (Alcock & Alcock 1992, 242). As a result of this list, Alcock undertook a series of what he called 'reconnaissance excavations' on sites in the list; today, these would be termed evaluations. The purpose of these was very different from the large scale excavation of South Cadbury. Rather than an extensive excavation producing large amounts of data, the intention was to target specific areas of each site to recover evidence that would indicate whether or not the site had been occupied during the Dark Ages. His fieldwork was published in a series of reports in the Proceedings of the Society of Antiquaries of Scotland (Alcock et al. 1986; Alcock & Alcock 1987; Alcock et al. 1989; Alcock & Alcock 1990; Alcock & Alcock 1992). The results of the excavations indicated that he had been correct in the majority of his identifications, and he had achieved his intention of providing a base of information for others to work from. It is also important to note the involvement of his wife Elizabeth in the publishing of these papers. She was an integral part of the research programme and was an archaeologist in her own right.

== Retirement ==
Leslie Alcock retired from the University of Glasgow in 1990. He was still working on the publications of his reconnaissance excavations and on the publication of the South Cadbury excavation. His involvement in the latter decreased after his publication of the early medieval material in 1995, and the earlier periods were left to a team of researchers from the Department of Archaeology at Glasgow University, led by John C. Barrett. He was now working more on synthetic works about the early medieval period and trying not to have any more to do with Arthur, who had become something of a millstone to him. His work culminated in the publication of a book based upon his 1989 Rhind lectures, Kings & Warriors, Craftsmen & Priests (Alcock 2003). By this time, he had been appointed an OBE (in 1991), but his health was now failing, and he retired fully from archaeology. He died on 6 June 2006, at Stevenage.

== Personal life ==
Alcock met his wife, Elizabeth (née Blair), at Oxford; they had a son and a daughter.

== Archives ==
The archives of Leslie Alcock are maintained by the Archives of the University of Glasgow (GUAS).

== Bibliography ==
- Adomnán's Life of Columba. Ed & trans (1991) Anderson, A. O. & Anderson, M. O. Clarendon Press, Oxford. ISBN 0-19-820215-6.
- Alcock, L 1963 Dinas Powys: An Iron Age, Dark Age and Early Medieval Settlement in Glamorgan. University of Wales Press. ISBN 0-7083-0000-6
- Alcock, L 1965 Hillforts in Wales and the Marches, Antiquity, 39 (1965), 184–95.
- Alcock, L 1967 Excavations at Degannwy Castle, Caernarfonshire, 1961–6, Archaeological Journal, 124, 190–201.
- Alcock, L 1971 Arthur's Britain: History and Archaeology AD 367–634 . Allen Lane, The Penguin Press. ISBN 0-14-139069-7
- Alcock, L 1972 By South Cadbury Is That Camelot... (New Aspects of Antiquity). Thames & Hudson, London. ISBN 0-500-39011-8.
- Alcock, L 1980 Populi Bestialis Pictorum feroci anime...: a survey of Pictish settlement archaeology, in Hanson, W. S. & Keppie, L. J. F. (eds) Roman Frontier Studies 1979. 61–95. BAR International Series 71, Oxford.
- Alcock, L 1981 Early Historic Fortifications in Scotland, in Guilbert, G (ed) Hillfort Studies. 150-80. Leicester University Press. ISBN 0-7185-1200-6.
- Alcock, L 1983 The archaeology of Celtic Britain: fifth to twelfth centuries, in Hinton, D. A. (ed) 25 Years of Medieval Archaeology. 48–66. University of Sheffield, Sheffield. ISBN 0-906090-11-3.
- Alcock, L, Alcock E A & Foster, S M 1986 Reconnaissance excavations on Early Historic fortifications and other royal sites in Scotland, 1974–84: 1, Excavations near St Abb's Head, Berwickshire, 1980, Proc Soc Antiq Scot, 116 (1986), 255–279.
- Alcock, L 1987 Economy, Society and Warfare Among the Britons and Saxons, c. 400-c. 800 AD. University of Wales Press. ISBN 0-7083-0963-1.
- Alcock, L & Alcock, E A 1987 Reconnaissance excavations on Early Historic fortifications and other royal sites in Scotland, 1974–84: 2, Excavations at Dunollie Castle, Oban, Argyll, 1978, Proc Soc Antiq Scot, 117 (1987), 73–101.
- Alcock, L 1989 Bede, Eddius and the Forts of the North Britons. Parish of Jarrow. ISBN 0-903495-20-1
- Alcock, L, Alcock, E A & Driscoll, S T 1989 Reconnaissance excavations on Early Historic fortifications and other royal sites in Scotland, 1974–84: 3, Excavations at Dundurn, Strathearn, Perthshire, 1976–77, Proc Soc Antiq Scot, 119 (1989), 189–226.
- Alcock, L & Alcock, E A 1990 Reconnaissance excavations on Early Historic fortifications and other royal sites in Scotland, 1974–84: 4, Excavations at Alt Clut, Clyde Rock, Strathclyde, 1974–75, Proc Soc Antiq Scot, 120 (1990), 95–150.
- Alcock, L & Alcock, E A 1992 Reconnaissance excavations on Early Historic fortifications and other royal sites in Scotland, 1974–84; 5: A, Excavations and other fieldwork at Forteviot, Perthshire, 1981; B, Excavations at Urquhart Castle, Inverness-shire, 1983; C, Excavations at Dunnottar, Kincardineshire, 1984, Proc Soc Antiq Scot, 122 (1992), 215–88.
- Alcock, L, Stenvenson, S. J. & Musson, C. R. 1995 Cadbury Castle, Somerset: The Early Medieval Archaeology. University of Wales Press. ISBN 0-7083-1275-6.
- Barrett, J.C., Freeman, P.W.M., Woodward, A. & Speller, K. 2000 Cadbury Castle, Somerset: The Later Prehistoric and Romano-British Archaeology. English Heritage. ISBN 1-85074-716-4.
- Alcock, L 2003 Kings and Warriors, Craftsmen and Priests in Northern Britain AD 550–850. Society of Antiquaries of Scotland monograph, Edinburgh. ISBN 0-903903-24-5.
