= Trendle Ring =

Prehistoric earthwork in Somerset, England

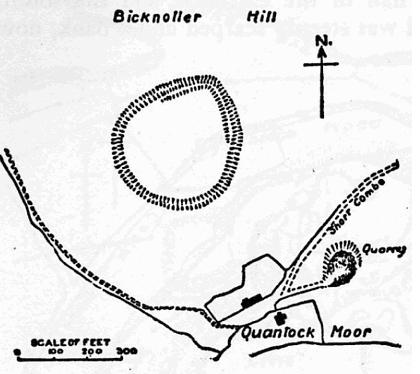
- Plan of earthworks at Trendle Ring

- Location within Somerset
- 51°08′51″N 3°15′49″W
- Location: Bicknoller, Somerset, England

History
- Built: Iron Age

Site notes
- Area: 0.8 hectares (2.0 acres)

Scheduled monument
- Official name: Trendle Ring hillfort and associated outwork
- Designated: 09 April 1976
- Reference no.: 1008249

Trendle Ring (or Trundle Ring) is a late prehistoric earthwork on the Quantock Hills near Bicknoller in Somerset, England. It is a Scheduled Monument. In 2013 it was added to the Heritage at Risk Register due to vulnerability to plant growth.

The word trendle means circle, so it is a tautological place name.

The site, which covers 0.8 hectares (2.0 acres), is surrounded by a single rampart with a ditch and has a simple opening on the East, uphill side. The hillside is steep and there are two areas which may have been more level platforms. It is situated on the slope of a hill which rises 130 m above the ring.

== Possible interpretations ==
Both the period of construction and the original purpose of the earthwork are uncertain. It has been described at different times by different authorities as a fort, a settlement, a livestock enclosure and a hill-slope enclosure. It may have served different purposes at different times. It has never been excavated and no found artifacts are associated with it.

The size of the 'ramparts' would argue for a defensive purpose, but the only entrance on the uphill side would not. The lack of any water supply would argue against any permanent human occupation and against its use as a livestock enclosure, although two more level areas inside the earthwork have been identified as possible building platforms. Hill-slope enclosures are found in South West England dating from the first and second millennium BC. When excavated, they have sometimes been found to have had settlements inside them, resembling defensible farmsteads, but the extreme steepness of this site and its location halfway up the scarp of the Quantocks make it difficult to assign it a purely practical purpose.

== See also ==
- Plainsfield Camp
- Dowsborough
- List of hillforts and ancient settlements in Somerset
- The Trendle, an ancient earthwork at Cerne Abbas
