= Hill-slope enclosure =

Type of prehistoric earthwork

The term hill-slope enclosure describes a type of late prehistoric earthwork found across South West England and also in Wales.

== Description ==
Normally formed from a single bank, or ditch and bank, enclosing an area of less than 1 hectare (2.5 acres; 10,000 m^{2}), and not on the summit of a hill. They are often found on a spur of a larger hill or range of hills.

== Purpose ==
The original purpose of the hill-slope enclosure is obscure but it is thought that they were not primarily defensive structures. Surveys and excavations have revealed low densities of postholes and storage pits suggesting they functioned as defensible farmsteads and permanent livestock enclosures.

They may also have served different purposes at different times and they may have had symbolic and religious significance which is now impossible to determine.
