= Dina =

Female given name

- Gender: Unisex (mostly female)

Origin
- Meaning: Justified, judged, vindicated, faith, religion, light
- Region of origin: Hebrew, Arabic

Other names
- Related names: Edina, Adina, Ad-Din (Ud-Din, Uddin), Dino

Dina Hebrew: דִּינָה Dinah [diˈna];/ˈdiːnə/ (Arabic: دينا Dīnā [ˈdiːnæ(ː)] is a female given name which is sometimes an alternative spelling of the names Dinah, Dena and Deena, which holds meanings such as justified, judged, and vindicated.

In the Balkans, Dina is popular among Bosniaks in the former Yugoslav nations. The name is derived from the Hebrew word לדון (ladoon), meaning to discuss. It is similar to other popular names in this group, such as Edina and Adina. It is often used as a nickname for women with "din" in their name. This region also has a male equivalent: Dino (for example, Dino Abazović).

== Given name ==
- Dina bint Abdul-Hamid (1929–2019), Queen consort of Jordan, first wife of King Hussein
- Princess Dina Mired of Jordan (born 1965), Princess of Jordan, wife of Prince Mired bin Ra'ad
- Dina Asher-Smith (born 1995), British sprinter and British 100m & 200m record holder
- Dina Averina (born 1998), Russian rhythmic gymnast
- Dina Aziz, British–Bangladeshi influencer and writer
- Dina Babbitt (1923–2009), Czech-born American painter and Holocaust survivor
- Dina Bélanger (1897–1929), Canadian beatified Catholic nun, mystic and musician
- Dina Boluarte (born 1962), former president of Peru (2022–2025)
- Dina Chandidas, a medieval poet of Bengal
- Chhan Dina (born 1984), Cambodian painter and sculptor
- Dina Bonnevie (born 1961), Filipina actress
- Dina Carroll (born 1968), English singer
- Dina Doron, Israeli actress
- Dina Eastwood (born 1965), American reporter, news anchor and reality TV star, ex-wife of Clint Eastwood
- Dina Edling (1854–1935), Swedish opera singer
- Dina Feitelson (1926–1992), Israeli educator and professor
- Dina Ellermann (born 1980), Estonian dressage rider
- Dina Garipova (born 1991), Russian singer
- Dina Kotchetkova (born 1977), Russian artistic gymnast
- Dina Koston (1929?–2009), American pianist, music educator and composer
- Dina Lévi-Strauss or Dina Dreyfus (1911–1999), French ethnologist, anthropologist, sociologist and philosopher
- Dina Ali Lasloom, Saudi woman who was deported from the Philippines back to Saudi Arabia
- Dina Litovsky (born 1979), Ukrainian-born photographer
- Dina Lohan (born 1962), American television personality
- Dina Manzo, former co-star of The Real Housewives of New Jersey and star of HGTV's Dina's Party
- Dina Merrill, stage name of Nedenia Marjorie Hutton (1923–2017), American actress, socialite and philanthropist
- Dina Meyer (born 1968), American actress
- Dina Miftakhutdynova (born 1973), Ukrainian rower
- Dina Popova (1977–2025), Ukrainian financier and entrepreneur
- Dina Porat, Israeli historian
- Dina Powell (born 1973), American business executive and former government officeholder
- Dina Pugliese (born 1974), Canadian TV personality
- Dina Stars, Cuban activist and YouTuber
- Dina Tala'at (born 1964), Egyptian belly dancer
- Dina Titus (born 1950), Nevada politician
- Dina Vakil (born 1946), Indian journalist
- Dina Vinhofvers (1620–1651), Danish silk worker who made (and later retracted) an accusation of an assassination plot against the king
- Dina Wadia (1919–2017), daughter of Mohammad Ali Jinnah, the founder of Pakistan
- Raja Dina Nath (1795–1857), Privy Seal and finance minister (Diwan) in the Punjab empire of Maharaja Ranjit Singh

== See also ==
- Dinah (given name)
- Dena (given name)
- Deena, a list of people with the given name
