= Dinah (given name) =

Dinah is a Hebrew female given name meaning judged or vindicated.

== People with the name ==
- Dinah, a Biblical character
- Dinah Abrahamson, American author and politician
- Dinah Birch, English literary scholar
- Dinah Browne, American luger
- Dinah Cancer, the stage name of vocalist Mary Simms
- Dinah Casson, British interior designer
- Dinah Chan, Singaporean cyclist
- Dinah Christie, Canadian actress
- Dinah Craik, English novelist
- Dinah Derycke, French politician
- Dinah Eckerle, German handball player
- Dinah Faust, German-born French actress and singer
- Dinah Gamon, British artist
- Dinah Jane Hansen, singer from American girl group Fifth Harmony
- Dinah Hawken, New Zealand poet
- Dinah Henson, English amateur golfer
- Dinah Hinz, German actress
- Dinah Jane, American singer
- Dinah Jefferies, British novelist
- Dinah John, Native American supercentenarian
- Dinah Johnson, American children's writer
- Dinah Kaye, Scottish jazz singer
- Dinah Lee Küng, American writer
- Dinah Lauterman, Canadian musician, artist and sculptor
- Dinah Lenney, American actress and writer
- Dinah Manoff, American stage and film actress
- Dinah May, British model
- Dinah L. Moché, American astronomer
- Dinah Murray, educator and campaigner
- Dinah Nah, Swedish singer
- Dinah Newey, English table tennis player
- Dinah Margaret Norman, English chess player
- Dinah Nuthead, English colonial printer
- Dinah Elizabeth Pearce, British philanthropist
- Dinah Pfizenmaier, German tennis player
- Dinah Prentice, British artist
- Dinah Radtke, German activist
- Dinah Rose, British barrister
- Dinah Rudelhoff, Australian stage actor and theatre manager
- Dinah Salifou, last king of the Nalu people of Guinea
- Dinah Shearing, Australian actress
- Dinah Shelton, American lawyer and IACHR commissioner
- Dinah Sheridan, English actress
- Dinah Shore, American singer and actress
- Dinah Shtettin, Yiddish theater actress
- Dinah Shurey, British film producer and director
- Dinah Singer, American immunologist
- Dinah Sykes, American politician
- Dinah Washington, American vocalist
- Dinah Watts Pace, American teacher
- Dinah Whipple, leader in Portsmouth, New Hampshire's free Black community
- Dinah Williams, British organic farmer
- Dinah Hilda Kyomuhimbo, Ugandan research scientist

== Fictional characters ==
- Dinah Marler, a fictional character on the soap opera Guiding Light
- Dinah Morris, a character in George Eliot's novel Adam Bede
- Dinah Lance, the Black Canary in the DC Universe
- Dinah Soar, a fictional superhero in the Marvel Universe
- Dinah the Dachshund, a fictional Disney character
- Dinah the Dining Car, a character in Starlight Express

== See also ==
- Dina (given name)
- Deena
- Dinah (disambiguation)
