= Vakil (disambiguation) =

Vakil, Wakil, or variants can refer to:

- Terms relating to Islamic delegates or administrators:

- Vakil, a historical administrative position in Safavid Iran
- Vekil (also called "Vakel"), the Ottoman term for representatives or delegates
- Wakil, a deputy or delegate in Islamic law
- Al-Wakil, the Arabic word for an advocate, agent, or trustee

- Vakil, Iran, a village in northwestern Iran
- Vakil (surname), a surname
- The Vakil, an Urdu-language publication
- Wakil (surname), a surname
- Wakil (given name), a given name
