= Dinah (disambiguation) =

Dinah is a biblical character.

Dinah may also refer to:

== Given name ==
- Dinah (given name), includes a list of notable people and fictional characters with this name

== Film and television ==
- Dinah!, a 1970s daytime talk show hosted by Dinah Shore

== Music ==
- Dinah, a 1923 revue by Irvin Miller
- Dinah! (album), a 1956 music album by Dinah Washington
- "Dinah" (song), a song published in 1925
- "Dinah, Dinah Show us your Leg", an American bawdy song recorded various times since 1925
- Dinah, Yes Indeed!, a 1958 studio album by Dinah Shore
- "Someone's in the Kitchen with Dinah", a 19th-century song attributed to J. H. Cave

== Places ==
- Dinahs Corner, Delaware, an unincorporated community in Kent County, Delaware
- Dinah Washington Park, a park in Chicago, Illinois

== Other uses ==
- 17472 Dinah, a main-belt asteroid
- Dinah, Allied code name during World War II of the Mitsubishi Ki-46, a Japanese airplane
- The Dinah, colloquial name for Club Skirts Dinah Shore Weekend, an American lesbian music festival

== See also ==
- Deena
- Dena (disambiguation)
- Dina (disambiguation)
