= Gamon =

Gamon is a surname. Notable people with the surname include:

- Claudia Gamon (born 1988), Austrian politician
- Dinah Gamon, English silversmith
- François-Joseph Gamon (1767–1832), French politician
- Hannibal Gamon (c. 1582–c. 1651), Puritan divine
- John Gamon, Canadian scientist
- John Gamon (RAF officer) (1898–1976), British RAF pilot in the First World War
- Noam Gamon (born 1997), Israeli soccer player
