= Dena (given name) =

Dena is a given name derived from Dinah and may refer to:

- Dena Atlantic, American television actress
- Dena M. Carli, American politician
- Dena M. Coggins (born 1979), American judge
- Dena Coward, Canadian sports event coordinator
- Dena DeRose (born 1966), American jazz pianist
- Dena Dietrich (1928–2020), American actress
- Dena Dubal, American neurodegenerative disease researcher
- Dena Epstein (1916–2013), American music librarian
- Dena Grayson (born 1971), American medical doctor
- Dena Hankins (born 1975), American novelist and short story author
- Dena Head (born 1970), former Women's National Basketball Association player
- Dena G. Hernandez, neurogeneticist
- Dena Higley (born 1958), American soap opera writer
- Dena Kaplan (born 1989), South African-born Australian actress
- Dena Kaye (born 1946), daughter of actor Danny Kaye
- Dena Kennedy (fl. 21st century), New Zealand actress
- Dena J. King (born 1981), American lawyer
- Dena Landon (born 1978), children's fiction fantasy writer
- Dena Mwana (born 1986), musical artist
- Dena Schlosser (born 1969), American murderer
- Dena A. Smith (1899–1968), American politician
- Dena Takruri (born 1983), American journalist
- Dena Tauriello, drummer for the rock band Antigone Rising since 1998
- Dena Thompson (born 1960), British murderer, con artist and bigamist
- Dena Vane-Kirkman (1944–2018), British magazine editor
- Dena Westerfield (born 1971), American IFBB professional female bodybuilder

== See also ==
- Deena, another given name
