= Dina Popova =

Ukrainian financier and businesswoman (1977–2025)

- Діна Попова
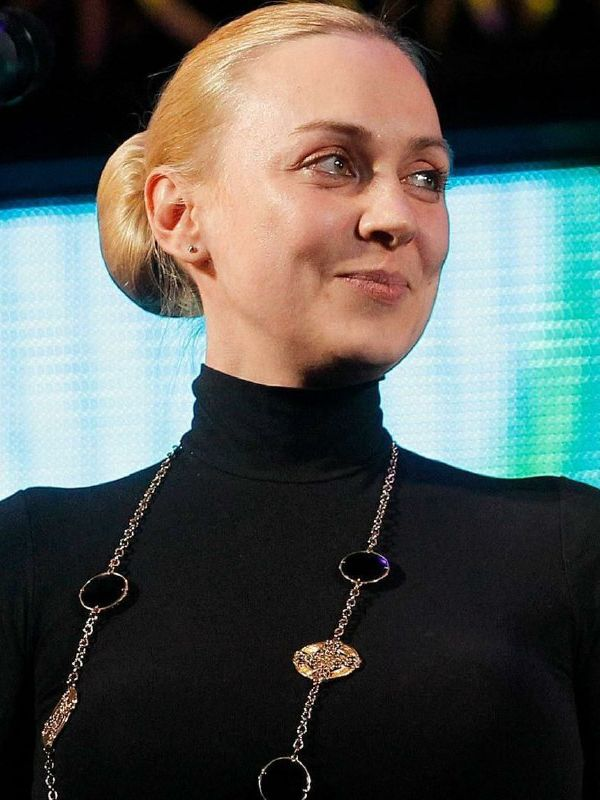
- Born: 16 July 1977; Lviv, Ukrainian SSR, USSR
- Died: 13 April 2025 (aged 47); Kyiv, Ukraine
- Awards: Order of Princess Olga

Dina Olehivna Popova (Ukrainian: Діна Олегівна Попова), (Note: In this name that follows East Slavic naming customs, the patronymic is Olehivna and the family name is Popova.) also known as Diana (Діана; 16 July 1977 – 13 April 2025) was a Ukrainian financier and businesswoman. Appointed the head of the Kyiv History Museum in September 2022, she was also the head of the Department of Culture of the Kyiv City State Administration in 2014–2021 and a Candidate of Historical Sciences (2013).

== Biography ==
Dina Popova was born in Lviv on 16 July 1977. Her father was a nuclear physicist who was acquainted with Victor Yushchenko for a long time.

=== Education ===
Popova graduated the finance faculty of the National Academy of Management in 1999. In 2001 she received a Master of International Law from the Taras Shevchenko National University of Kyiv in the institute of International relations.

Dina Popova completed many courses at various institutions:

- 2009: Hennadiy Udovenko Diplomatic Academy of Ukraine under the Ministry of Foreign Affairs
- 2013: Aspen Institute of Kyiv Responsible Leadership course
- 2018: Ukrainian School of Political Studies and the Leadership Academy
- 2021: President MBA program at the Kyiv-Mohyla Business School (KMBS)

In 2013, she defended her PhD thesis entitled "The Crimean Question in Ukrainian-Russian Relations (1991–2010)" and became a Candidate of Historical Sciences with a specialization in World History.

=== Illness and death ===
Dina Popova began chemotherapy in 2022. In March 2025, she wrote on her Facebook page that she was "going through the hardest weeks of her life." Popova died in Kyiv on 13 April 2025, at the age of 47.

== Career ==
=== Business ===
Dina Popova worked at OLBank and as an assistant waitress at a restaurant during her studying at the National Academy of Management from 1993 to 1999.

=== Civil service ===
In July 2014 Popova entered civil service. She began with becoming an assistant-consultant of Pavlo Riabikin and from August to October 2014 was the First Deputy Director of the Department of Culture of the Kyiv City State Administration. On 28 October 2014 Popova was appointed Director of the Department of Culture of the executive body of the Kyiv City State Administration.

In September 2022 Popova was appointed General Head of the Kyiv History Museum.

== Awards ==
- 2018 — Ukrainian Order of Princess Olga, third grade;
- 2018 — Italian Order of the Star of Italy;
- 2020 — French Order of Arts and Letters.
