= Dena (disambiguation) =

Dena is a mountain range within the Zagros Mountains, Iran.

Dena, DeNA, or DENA may also refer to:

== Businesses and organizations ==
- DeNA, a mobile portal and e-commerce company in Japan
- Dena Bank, a bank in India
- Deutschen Energie-Agentur, the German Energy Agency; see Nuclear power in Germany
- Deutsche Nachrichtenagentur (DENA), broadcaster of the US occupying power in post WWII Germany

== People ==
- Dena (given name), a list of people with the name
- Kanze Dena, Kenyan journalist
- Lawrence Dena, Anglican bishop in Kenya
- Lal Dena, Indian historian
- Patrick de Napoli, Swiss footballer nicknamed "DeNa"
- Sina Ataeian Dena, Iranian film director
- Dena Cass, Miss Continental Plus 1997

== Places ==
- Dena (land area), administrative subdivision of the area around Morella, Castellón, Spain
- Dena County, Iran
- Pasadena and Altadena, closely related towns in California

== Other ==
- Diethylnitrosamine (DENA), a carcinogenic chemical compound found in tobacco smoke
- Dena (coin), historical 10-lira coin in pre-unification Italy
- Dena, an ancient Old English name for Danes
- IRIS Dena, an Iranian Moudge-class frigate
- IKCO Dena, automobile manufactured by Iran Khodro
