= Litovsky =

Litovsky is a surname. Notable people with the surname include:

- Dina Litovsky (born 1979), Ukrainian-born photographer
- Valentin Litovsky (1921–1941), Soviet actor
