= Abazović (surname) =

Abazović is a surname. Notable people with the surname include:

- Dritan Abazović (born 1985), Prime Minister of Montenegro
- Dino Abazović (born 1972), Bosnian sociologist
