= Wakil (surname) =

Wakil or El-Wakil is a surname commonly found in the Islamic world. Notable people with this surname include:

== Wakil ==
- Salih J. Wakil (1927 – 2019), an American biochemist
- Idris Abdul Wakil (1925 – 2000), a former president of Zanzibar
- Sahib Rohullah Wakil (born circa 1962), an Afghan detained at Guantanamo Bay
- Genan Wakil (born 1996), a Syrian poet and writer
- Susan Wakil (1933 – 2018), a Romanian businesswoman and philanthropist
- Mohammed Wakil (born 1965), a Nigerian minister

== El-Wakil ==
- Abdel-Wahed El-Wakil (born 1943), an Egyptian architect
- Omar El-Wakil (born 1988), an Egyptian handball player

== See also ==
- Wakil (given name), the corresponding given name
- Vakil (surname), a similar surname
- Wakil, a concept in Islamic law
