= Shapeshifter's Quest =

2005 book by Dena Landon

- First edition cover
- Author: Dena Landon
- Genre: Young adult novel
- Publisher: Dutton Press
- Publication date: August 1, 2005
- ISBN: 0-525-47310-6

Shapeshifter's Quest is a 2005 young adult novel by American author Dena Landon.

== Plot summary ==
Syanthe is about 18 years old. She is a shapeshifter and has lived with other shapeshifters in the Carlbine forest all her life. Because of an incident that happened years ago, the King had confined all shapeshifters to the Carlbine forest. He marked all of the shapeshifters with a magical tattoo on their faces that would kill them if they crossed the boundaries of the forest. All of the shapeshifters were marked, except Syanthe, who had been hidden at birth from the King's men. When the Carlbine forest and the shapeshifters (who are closely bonded to the forest) slowly grew sick with an illness, Syanthe's mother included. She set out into the King's capital to obtain the cure for the illness. A few days or so later after Syanthe left the forest, she was caught by a caravan of whom she thought to be traders. She decided to join these travelers on their way to the capital. She soon found out that the leader of the caravan, Jerel, had powerful magical powers, and realized that there was something amiss with the whole caravan. Together she and this odd caravan will enter the city and try to get the antidote, but along the way, weird occurrences give more new goals to the travelers.
