= Vakil (surname) =

Vakil is an Arabic surname. Notable people with the surname include:

- Abhay Vakil (1951–2021), Indian businessman
- Ardashir Vakil, Indian novelist
- Dina Vakil (born 1946), Indian journalist
- Pandit Divyang Vakil, Indian spiritual teacher
- Laila Vakil (born 1974), British swimmer
- Nanubhai Vakil (1902–1980), Indian film director
- Ravi Vakil (born 1970), Canadian-American mathematician
- Shereveer Vakil, Indian actor and gym trainer
- Tarjani Vakil, Indian banker
