= Dena Landon =

American novelist

- Born: November 18, 1977 (age 48)
- Education: Gordon College
- Occupation: Writer
- Writing career
- Genre: Fantasy

Dena Landon (born November 18, 1977) is an American children's fiction fantasy writer, who wrote Shapeshifter's Quest in 2005. She is currently working on a new novel, as well as a Shapeshifter sequel.

== Life ==
Raised first in Kirkland, Washington and then in Seattle, Washington, Dena Landon took to reading and English classes from an early age. In 1991 her parents divorced and she moved to Bellevue. After graduating from high school in 1996, Dena moved to Boston, where she attended Gordon College. Although she majored in Business Administration, she developed her writing skills by working with professors from the English department. After graduating in 1999, Dena gained a job in finance, but worked on a novel in her free time. She now lives in Hull, Massachusetts, with her son.

== Writings ==
Her first manuscript, for Shapeshifter's Quest, was taken up by Dutton's Children's Books in December 2002. Shapeshifter's Quest tells the story of an eighteen-year-old, Syanthe, who has the ability to transform herself into another shape at will. She uses her abilities to protect her race from extinction against a corrupt, tyrannical king. The novel was published in 2005 to generally positive reviews. She has also published a number of non-fiction and personal essays, and founded the online magazine Femme Feminism.
