= Hannibal Gamon =

Hannibal Gamon or Gammon (c.1582-c.1651) was an English Puritan divine.

== Education and early career ==
Gamon, descended from a family originally resident at Padstow in Cornwall, was the eldest son of Hannibal Gamon, who married Frances Galis of Windsor, and settled as a goldsmith in London. He matriculated from Broadgates Hall, Oxford, on 12 October 1599, at the age 17, when he was described as the son of a gentleman; and he took the degrees of B.A. on 12 May 1603 and M.A. on 27 February 1607.

Gamon was instituted to the rectory of Mawgan-in-Pyder, on the north coast of Cornwall, on 11 February 1619, on presentation of Elizabeth Peter, the patroness for that turn, on the assignment of Sir John Arundell, knight, the owner of the advowson. He was also nominated a chaplain to the first Lord Robartes, whom he aided in collecting the library, mainly of divinity and philosophy, that was preserved at Lanhydrock, near Bodmin. Many of the books have Gamon's autograph on the title. The collection includes several manuscript volumes in his handwriting, containing theological and medical notes and prescriptions.

== Later ministry ==
Gamon's ministry, says Anthony Wood, was "much frequented by the puritanical party for his edifying and practical way of preaching". On 20 April 1642 he was designated, with Gaspar Hickes (1605–1677) of Landrake, as the representative of Cornwall in the Westminster Assembly of divines. Gamon does not seem to have taken his place in the assembly, possibly on account of the remoteness of his residence, and his absence from its proceedings appears to have given offence. John Walker, in his Sufferings of the Clergy (ii. 249), professes to have been informed that Gamon was "so miserably harass'd that it broke his heart". There is a gap in the parish registers from 1646 to 1660, but it is generally believed that he died around 1651.

== Works ==
Gamon was the author of A Funeral Sermon Upon Ladie Frances Roberts (The Praise of a Godly Woman) (London, 1627), and two Assize Sermons at Launceston in 1621 (Gods Just Desertion of the Unjust) and 1628 (Gods Smiting to Amendment, or, Revengement). A long letter from Degory Wheare to him, dated April 1626, is in Wheare's Epistolæ Eucharisticæ, 1628 (pp. 85–93), and a short epistle is printed in Wheare's Charisteria (p. 133), both of which works are included in Wheare's volume with the general title of Pietas, erga Benefactores.
