= Chhan Dina =

Cambodian painter and sculptor

- Born: 1984 (age 41–42); Phnom Penh, Cambodia
- Notable work: Fly No Fear (2021)
- Awards: CLMTV Contemporary Art Award (2015)
- Website: http://www.artistdina.com

Chhan Dina (born 1984) is a Cambodian painter and sculptor known for her works that delve into themes of nature, wildlife, and the human experience. Her art reflects Cambodia's cultural heritage and the country's ongoing journey of recovery and growth after the Cambodian Civil War, the Khmer Rouge dictatorship, the Cambodian genocide, and the Cambodian-Vietnamese war.

== Life ==
Dina Chhan was born in Phnom Penh and spent her early years in a refugee camp in Poipet, a town near the Cambodian border with Thailand. This area is rich in natural beauty but contains hidden landmines and has influenced her perception of the world. As a child, she crafted toys from clay, showcasing an innate artistic talent. Her family later relocated to Phnom Penh, where she encountered Ron Remen, a charity worker who recognized her potential and provided foundational training in sculpting and drawing. Today, Dina continues to live and work in Phnom Penh, where she operates her own gallery.

== Career ==
Dina is one of the few female artists on Cambodia's contemporary arts scene. She participated in the Cambodian Living Arts Fellows Programme in 2016. She received the CLMTV Contemporary Art Awards at Mahasarakham University in Thailand. In 2021, Dina had an exhibition by the name of "Fly No Fear" at the Sofitel Phnom Penh Phokeethra, where she exhibited environmental themes to raise awareness about the importance of preserving natural habitats. Dina's work has gained international attention, leading to exhibitions in countries such as Australia, Colombia, France, the United States, China, Singapore, Thailand, and Vietnam. She has taught visual art to children in orphanages and schools. In early 2022, she has opened her own gallery.

== Themes ==
Dina's themes include exploring women's roles and experiences. She also explores themes of nature and wildlife. Her exhibition entitled "On the Verge of Extinction" focused on endangered bird species in Cambodia. "Drawing the Golden Thread" was shown at the Intercontinental hotel and focused on the beauty of Cambodia's nature. Generally, she remarks that ideas for her works spawn when she takes excursions in her local rainforests, noting the haphazardly vibrant gestalt that unfolds as one walks further into the abyss of Cambodian verdure. Translating this into art, each piece features fauna of the rainforest revealing themselves amidst their hyperstimulating environment.

Dina also focuses on Cambodia's recent history and recovery after its civil war and the Khmer Rouge dictatorship. In her youth, she was inspired by the ongoing issues of land mines throughout the country, which were planted during the long period of war in the 1970s and 1980s. Many of her works take inspiration from the fear and devastation caused by unexploded ordnance. In deliberate reference to the violence of the 1970s, Dina often uses psychedelic colors in her paintings. Dina's expression of the impact of war often intersects with the experiences of women and natural landscapes.

== Awards ==
Dina won the Young Artists Award from CLMTV Contemporary Art in 2015. She was also nominated for the ASEAN Women of the Future Awards in 2018.

== Exhibitions ==
Dina has led or participated in multiple exhibitions, most them of in Phnom Penh:

- 2005: International Cultural Exhibition; Siem Reap, Cambodia
- 2006: Wildlife Conservation Society; Cambodia
- 2009: IMPACT: An art exhibition about landmines in Cambodia, United Nations; New York, USA
- 2010: You Khin Memorial Women's Art Prize, Cambodia
- 2010: Across the Line; Phnom Penh, Cambodia
- 2010: The Art of Dirt; Denver, Colorado, USA
- 2011: Java Arts Exhibition; Phnom Penh, Cambodia
- 2011: Peace Exhibition; Siem Reap, Cambodia
- 2012: The Plantation Gallery, Cambodian Mask Project; Phnom Penh, Cambodia
- 2012: Meta House; Phnom Penh, Cambodia
- 2013: Equinox Exhibition; Phnom Penh, Cambodia
- 2014: Meta House Exhibition; Phnom Penh, Cambodia
- 2014: Intercontinental Hotel; Phnom Penh, Cambodia
- 2015: Intercontinental Hotel; Phnom Penh, Cambodia
- 2017: Dina Chhan & Frederikke Tu at Intercontinental; Phnom Penh, Cambodia
- 2017: On the Verge of Extinction, Inside Gallery Intercontinental; Phnom Penh, Cambodia
- 2018: Takakazu Yamada & Dina Chhan at Plantation; Phnom Penh, Cambodia
- 2019: Kbach Art Gallery; Phnom Penh, Cambodia
- 2020: Plantation Hotel and Palace Gate Hotel; Phnom Penh, Cambodia
- 2021: Fly No Fear, Project Sofitel Hotel; Phnom Penh, Cambodia
- 2022: The Chhan Dina Gallery; Phnom Penh, Cambodia
