= Dena Atlantic =

American actress

Dena Atlantic is an actress best known for her role as Floria Mills in the television series Oz. Atlantic has also played in the Playwrights Horizons Studio Theater.

== Filmography ==
- Ed .... Vivian Ghanda (2 episodes, 2002–2003)
  - - The Decision (2003) TV episode .... Vivian Ghanda
  - - Trapped (2002) TV episode .... Vivian Ghanda
- Brown Sugar (2002) .... Hot 97 Assistant ... a.k.a. Seven Days
- Sex and the City .... Carrie's Limo Driver (1 episode, 2002)
  - - Plus One Is the Loneliest Number (2002) TV episode .... Carrie's Limo Driver
- Oz .... Floria Mills (8 episodes, 2001–2002)
  - - Dream a Little Dream of Me (2002) TV episode .... Floria Mills
  - - Laws of Gravity (2002) TV episode .... Floria Mills
  - - Visitation (2002) TV episode .... Floria Mills
  - - Famous Last Words (2001) TV episode .... Floria Mills
  - - Orpheus Descending (2001) TV episode .... Floria Mills
  - - Blizzard of '01 (2001) TV episode .... Floria Mills
  - - Revenge Is Sweet (2001) TV episode .... Floria Mills
  - - Conversions (2001) TV episode .... Floria Mills (3 more)
- Face (2002) .... Clinic Nurse
- Third Watch .... Mrs. Professional (1 episode, 2000)
  - - Run of the Mill (2000) TV episode .... Mrs. Professional
