= Dinah Radtke =

German disability rights activist

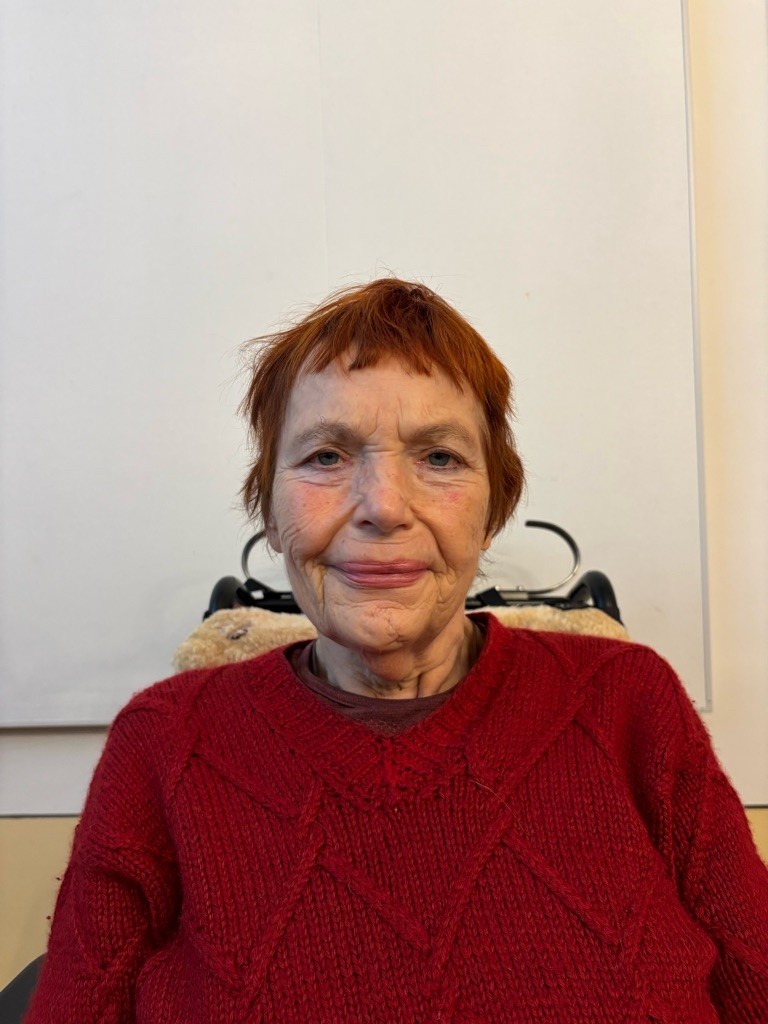
- Dinah Radtke in the Erlangen City Library in 2026
- Born: 10 September 1947 (age 79); Bamberg, Bavaria, West Germany

Dinah Christine Radtke (born 10 September 1947) is a German activist in the disability rights movement. She is a co-founder of the Center for Independent Living for People with Disabilities (ZSL) in Erlangen.

== Biography ==
Dinah Radtke is a state-certified translator for English and French. Due to spinal muscular atrophy, she uses a wheelchair. Since the 1970s, she has been advocating for the rights and needs of people with disabilities. As a champion of the independent living movement, she co-founded the Center for Independent Living (Zentrum für Selbstbestimmtes Leben e.V.) in Erlangen in 1987 and headed its counseling department from 1997 to 2014.

In 1990, she co-founded the nationwide umbrella organization Interessenvertretung Selbstbestimmt Leben eV (ISL). In 1991, the association became a member of the international disability rights organization Disabled Peoples International (DPI), where Radtke served as vice president for several years. From 2003 to 2006, she actively participated in the negotiations on the United Nations Convention on the Rights of Persons with Disabilities, serving as the DPI's representative for human rights.

In 1998 she co-founded the association Weibernetz, a nationwide umbrella organization for disabled women, and in 1999 she co-founded the network of and for women with disabilities in Bavaria.

== Select honours ==
- 2000: Cross of the Order of Merit of the Federal Republic of Germany
- 2009: Officer's cross of the Order of Merit of the Federal Republic of Germany
- 2016: Honorary citizenship of the city of Erlangen
- 2019: Bezirksmedaille des Bezirks Mittelfranken
- 2019: Bayerische Verfassungsmedaille in Silber

== Literature ==
- Georg Pöhlein (2019), Stadt Erlangen, Sozialreferat (ed.), "Dinah Radtke", Menschen in Erlangen, Erlangen, pp. 38–49
