= Deena (singer) =

Deena Herr, who performs under the stage name Deena, is a German singer performing in Uganda.

A social worker in training from Berlin, Deena was discovered in 2013 by a Ugandan music producer while traveling in Kampala. Her single Mumulete! ("Bring him to me!"), written in the local language Luganda and released in 2015, was a viral hit in Uganda, leading to a career in Ugandan television and radio. Deena has attributed part of her success to the novelty of being a white woman performing in a local language, which the public much appreciates.
