= Tarjani Vakil =

Indian banker

Tarjani Vakil is a professional Indian banker, and was the first woman to head any large bank in India when she became Chairperson of the Exim Bank in 1993. After earning a postgraduate degree in history from Bombay University, she began her career at the Maharashtra State Finance Commission, which she joined in 1958 as a clerical worker. By 1965, she was the only female officer at the Industrial Development Bank of India. At the time that she was chairperson and managing director of Exim Bank, it had US$1.1 billion in assets. She retired from Exim in 1996.

In 1997, she was recognized by KPMG Worldwide Business as one of the top 50 women "to prove her valor" in the business. In 2011, she published "A Mosaic of Memories", an autobiographical sketch (for private circulation only).
