= Dinah Lauterman =

Canadian musician, artist and sculptor

- Born: August 6, 1899; Montreal, Quebec, Canada
- Died: June 14, 1945 (aged 45)
- Education: Art Association of Montreal; École des beaux-arts de Montréal
- Known for: Sculptor

Dinah Lauterman (1899–1945) was a Canadian musician, artist and sculptor.

She studied under Canadian Group of Painters founding member Randolph Hewton at the Art Association of Montreal and later under Edwin Holgate, Maurice Felix, Albert Laliberté, Charles Maillard, and Henri Charpentier at the École des beaux-arts de Montréal. Between 1922–1935, she actively exhibited her sculptures at the Art Association and Royal Canadian Academy of Arts annual exhibitions. Her work is included in the collections of the Montreal Museum of Fine Arts, the Musée national des beaux-arts du Québec and the École des beaux-arts de Montréal.

Following Lauterman's death at the age of 45, her sister Annie established an endowment for the creation of the Dinah Lauterman Library at McGill University. A memorial exhibition of her work was displayed in the Redpath Library in 1947 to commemorate the library's new special collection of fine art books.
