= Dinah L. Moché =

American astronomer (born 1936)

- Born: 24 October 1936
- Died: 22 May 2018 (aged 81)
- Education: B.A. Radcliffe College (1958); M.A. Columbia University (1961); Ph.D. Columbia University (1976)
- Spouse: Robert I Rozen
- Scientific career
- Fields: Astronomy
- Workplaces: New York University; Columbia University; Bronx Community College; Fashion Institute of Technology; Queensborough Community College
- Thesis: (1976)

Dinah L. Moché (24 October 1936 - 22 May 2018) was an American astronomer and author of several popular science books mainly dealing with astronomy.

She earned an AB in physics from Radcliffe College in 1958. She earned a MA in physics and a PhD in physics, astronomy, and science education research from Columbia University. She worked for many years as a Professor of Physics & Astronomy at Queensborough Community College of the City University of New York.

== Selected publications ==
- Moché, Dinah L. 2015. Astronomy: a self-teaching guide. 8th Edition, Hoboken, N.J. : John Wiley & Sons.
- Moché, D. L. (1976). Development of Educational Materials to Recruit Women into Scientific Careers. American Journal of Physics, 44(4), 390–391.
