= Dena G. Hernandez =

Neurogeneticist

Dena Michelle Godwin Hernandez wanted to get her PHD in neurology, so she attended the university of College London. After that, she got her M.Sc. Biotechnology in Johns Hopkins University located in Baltimore, Maryland. Her main area of expertise is in human molecular genetics, biology, gene expression, DNA and many more. Now, she works at the National Institute of on Aging and her position is the head of the genomic technology group as well as National Institutes of Health. At this other job, she works with genetic technologies, and transcriptomic investigations of neurodegenerative disorders, with a focus on Parkinson’s disease. She also has affiliations with University of Exeter, London and Centre de Génétique Moléculaire located in Gif-sur-Yvette, France.

Denna has received a total of 3 awards during her career. In 2022, 2023 and 2024 she got award “best female scientist”. she also has a total of 503 publications and 87,733 total reads and 55,285 citations. Some her most cited work includes, “Discovery and refinement of loci associated with lipid levels ”, “Common variants associated with plasma triglycerides and risk for coronary artery disease” and “Characterization of PLA2G6 as a locus for dystonia-parkinsonism”. Most of her work publications fall under 3 categories of studies: Genetics, Gene and Diseases. Through her career, she mainly focused on writing about Parkinson's disease, Alzheimer's disease and Dementia.
