= Kanze Dena =

Kenyan journalist

- Born: Kellen Beatrice Kanze Dena Mararo; Kwale County, Kenya
- Education: Foundation College of Professional Studies
- Occupations: Spokesperson, executive office of the president, Republic of Kenya; head of president's strategic communication unit (PSCU)
- Employer: Government of Kenya
- Known for: Journalism, Swahili news anchor, news director/producer
- Predecessor: Manoah Esipisu

Kanze Dena Mararo, also known as Kellen Beatrice Kanze Dena Mararo (born 1980), is a Swahili-Kenyan journalist who is a former spokesperson in the executive office of the president of the Republic of Kenya and Head of President's Strategic Communication Unit (PSCU).

She intended to join the Kenya Medical Training College, but after several unsuccessful application attempts, she shifted to studying Journalism and Mass Communication at Foundation College of Professional Studies.

Previously she worked as a news anchor who reported on current affairs, political interviews and entertainment. Dena has worked as a news anchor for other networks, including Kenya Broadcasting Corporation, Kenya Television Network, and Citizen TV. She resigned from Citizen TV in June 2018, after being appointed as the Deputy State House Spokesperson and Deputy Head of PSCU, before taking on her current role of Spokesperson in the Executive Office of the President.

== Early life and education ==
Dena was born to a taveta father and a Duruma mother. They initially resided in Mazeras in Kwale. She was raised by her mother along with her five siblings after her parents' divorce. She grew up in various parts of Kenya which included Kwale and Nairobi. She attended Kianjokoma Primary School (today known as the St. Matthews Mixed Boarding Primary School in Embu) as well as Kieni Girls High School for secondary education (O-levels). She graduated in 1997. Dena intended to join the Kenya Medical Training College, but after several unsuccessful application attempts, she shifted studying Journalism and Mass Communication at Foundation College of Professional Studies. Her mother died of colon cancer shortly after Dena gave birth to her first child.

== Career ==
Dena enrolled for a Journalism communications course at the Foundation College of Professional Studies. She did her journalism intern at Kenya Broadcasting Corporation (KBC) radio station as a Swahili news reader. She was later employed at KBC TV as a news anchor, alongside co-anchor Badi Muhsin. After working six years at the KBC, she transitioned to Citizen TV, where she experienced a significant rise in her popularity in Kenyan media. At Citizen TV, she was paired with Lulu Hassan, whom she anchored the news on Nipashe Wikendi with for almost six years.

Dena served as a Deputy State House Spokesperson and Deputy Head of the President's Strategic Communication Unit (PSCU) in charge of coordinating digital, messaging, research, branding and press at State House, in an effort of the Uhuru Kenyatta pushing the Big Four agenda and legacy building.

Currently she serves as the spokesperson in the Executive Office of the President and head of the PSCU.
