= Dinahs Corner, Delaware =

Unincorporated community in Delaware, United States

- Unincorporated community
- Location within Delaware Location within the United States
- Coordinates: 39°11′09″N 75°38′41″W
- Country: United States
- State: Delaware
- County: Kent
- Elevation: 62 ft (19 m)
- Time zone: UTC-5 (Eastern (EST))
  - Summer (DST): UTC-4 (EDT)
- Area code: 302
- GNIS feature ID: 216080

Dinahs Corner is an unincorporated community in Kent County, Delaware, United States. Dinahs Corner is located at the intersection of Pearsons Corner Road and Dinahs Corner Road, northwest of Dover.
