= Wakil (given name) =

Wakil is a masculine given name of Arabic origin. Notable people with this name include:

== Given name ==
- Wakil Ahmed (born 1941), a Bangladeshi academic
- Wakil Ahmed (singer), a Bangladeshi film director and singer
- Wakil Hussain Allahdad (1986–2018), an Afghan wrestler, community responder, and entrepreneur
- Wakil Ahmed Muttawakil (born 1971), an Afghan politician

== See also ==
- Wakil (surname), the corresponding surname
- Wakeel Allah, an American author
- Wakil, a concept in Islamic law
