= Kyiv History Museum =

Museum in Kyiv, Ukraine

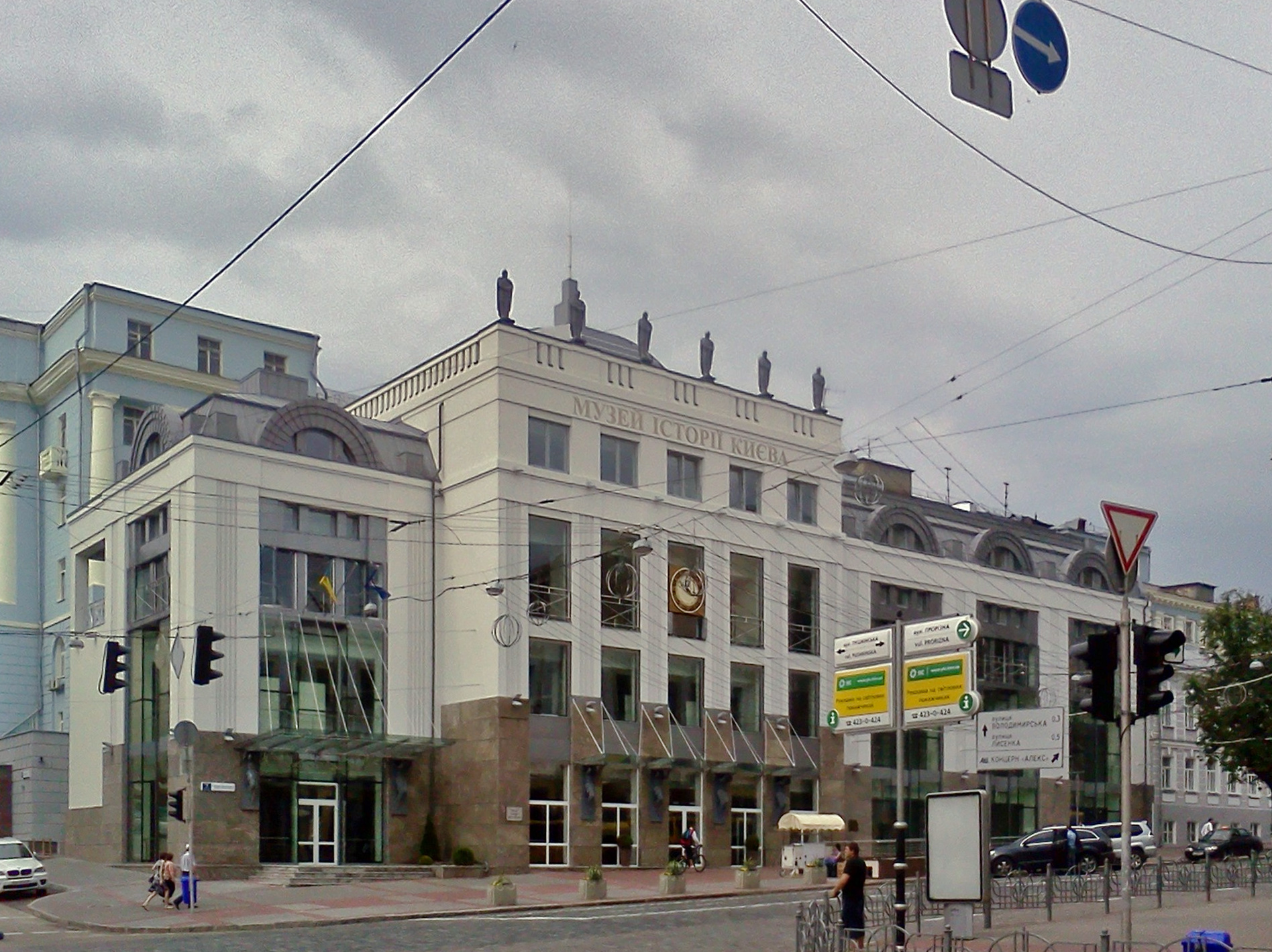
- The museum's main entrance
- Established: Spring 1979 (original); August 22, 2012 (current)
- Location: 7 Bohdan Khmelnytskyi St, Kyiv, Ukraine
- Coordinates: 50°26′42″N 30°31′03″E
- Website: https://kyivhistorymuseum.org.ua/en/

The Kyiv History Museum (Ukrainian: Музей історії Києва, romanized: Muzei istorii Kyieva) is a museum in Kyiv that first opened in 1979. The museum has many displays of historical artifacts from the city and its surrounding areas, which tells stories about the history of Kyiv.

== History ==
The museum was first completed in November 1978, and soon opened its first sections by early 1979. At the time, the museum mainly had archaeological collections from the Institute of Archaeology in Soviet Ukraine, including currency artifacts, cultural objects, old paintings, and postcards.

In a few years, the museum's collection expanded to about 36,000 items, and needed a larger space. The museum soon moved to a new location at Klov Palace, and reopened in 1982.

The museum remained at the palace for over 20 years, and had a total of 18 halls for exhibitions. The museum became a major cultural institution in Kyiv. On August 11, 2003, the Cabinet of Ukraine passed decree No. 506, which made the palace the new location for the Supreme Court of Ukraine. The museum soon closed by March 2004, and re-opened later that year at the Ukrainian House.

In June 2012, the museum closed once again for relocation. It reopened on August 22, 2012, at its current location: 7 Bohdan Khmelnytskyi Street, near Teatralna station.

== Gallery of Exhibitions ==
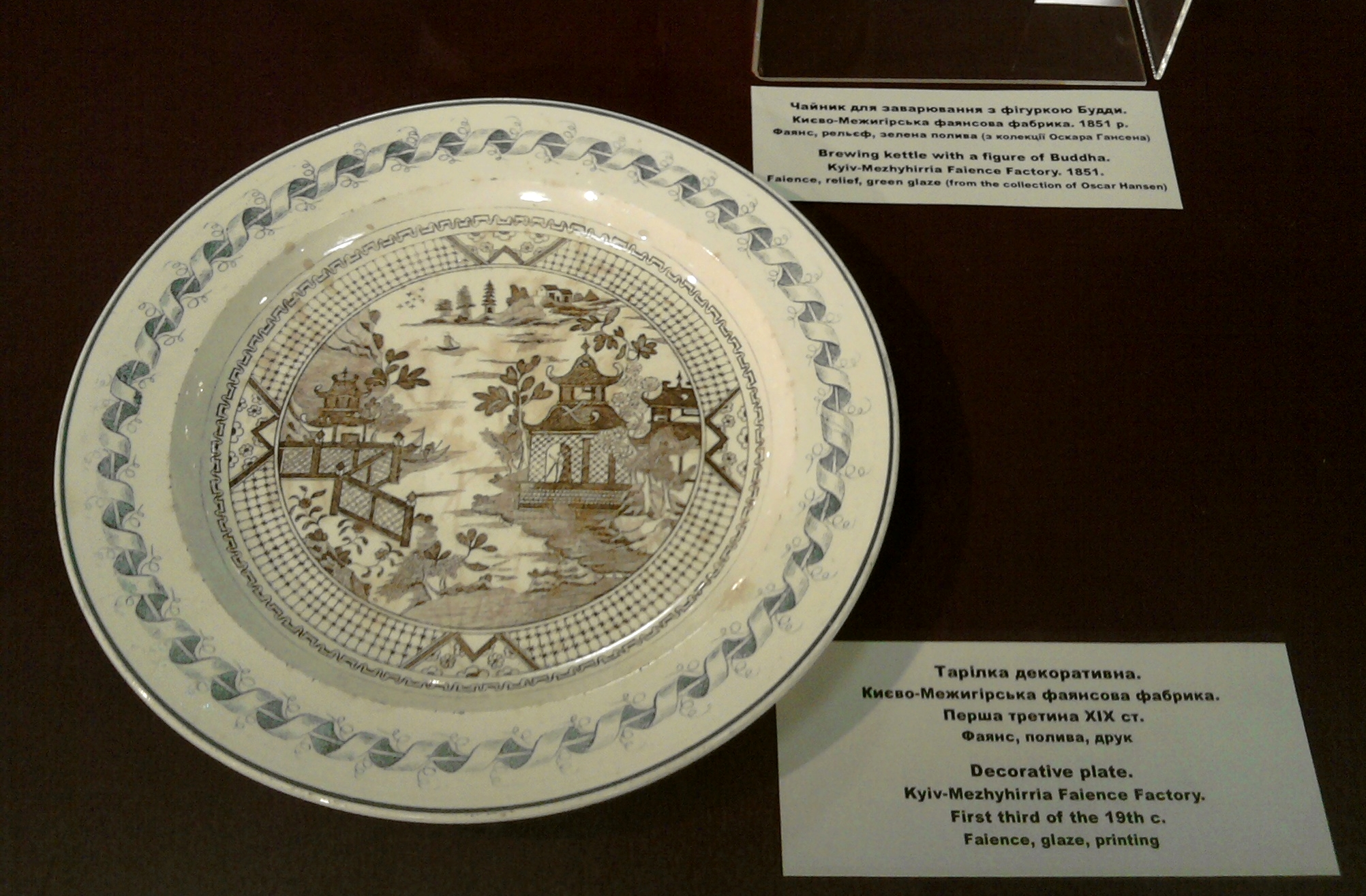
A plate from Kyiv Mezhyhirska Faience Factory

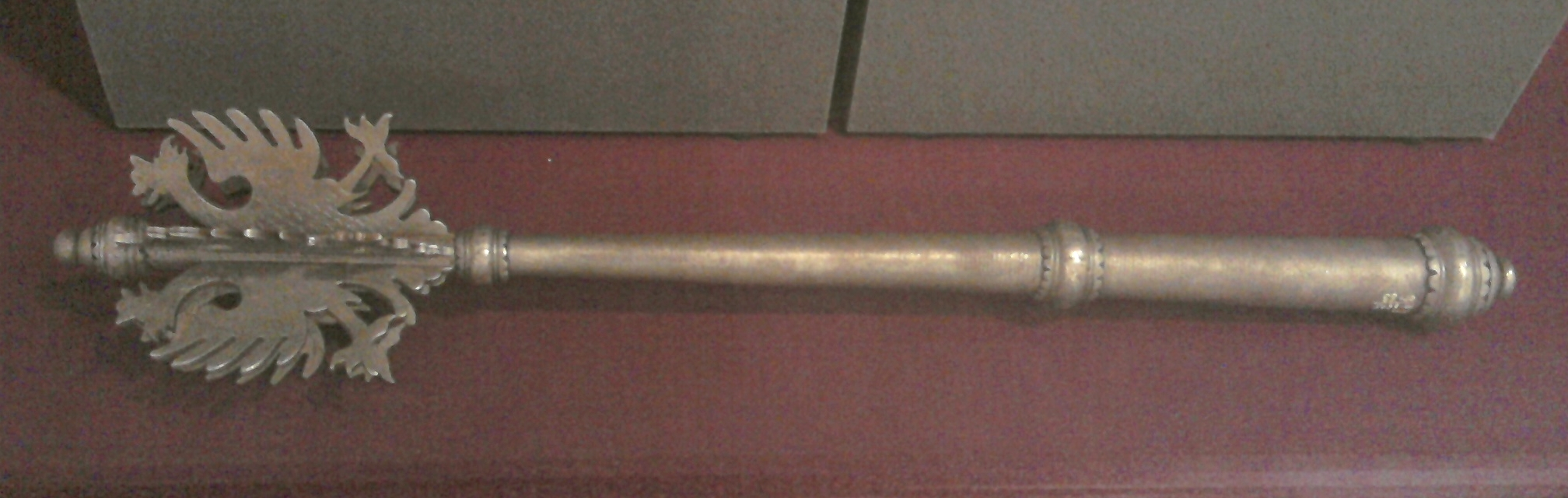
A Mace from late 17th century

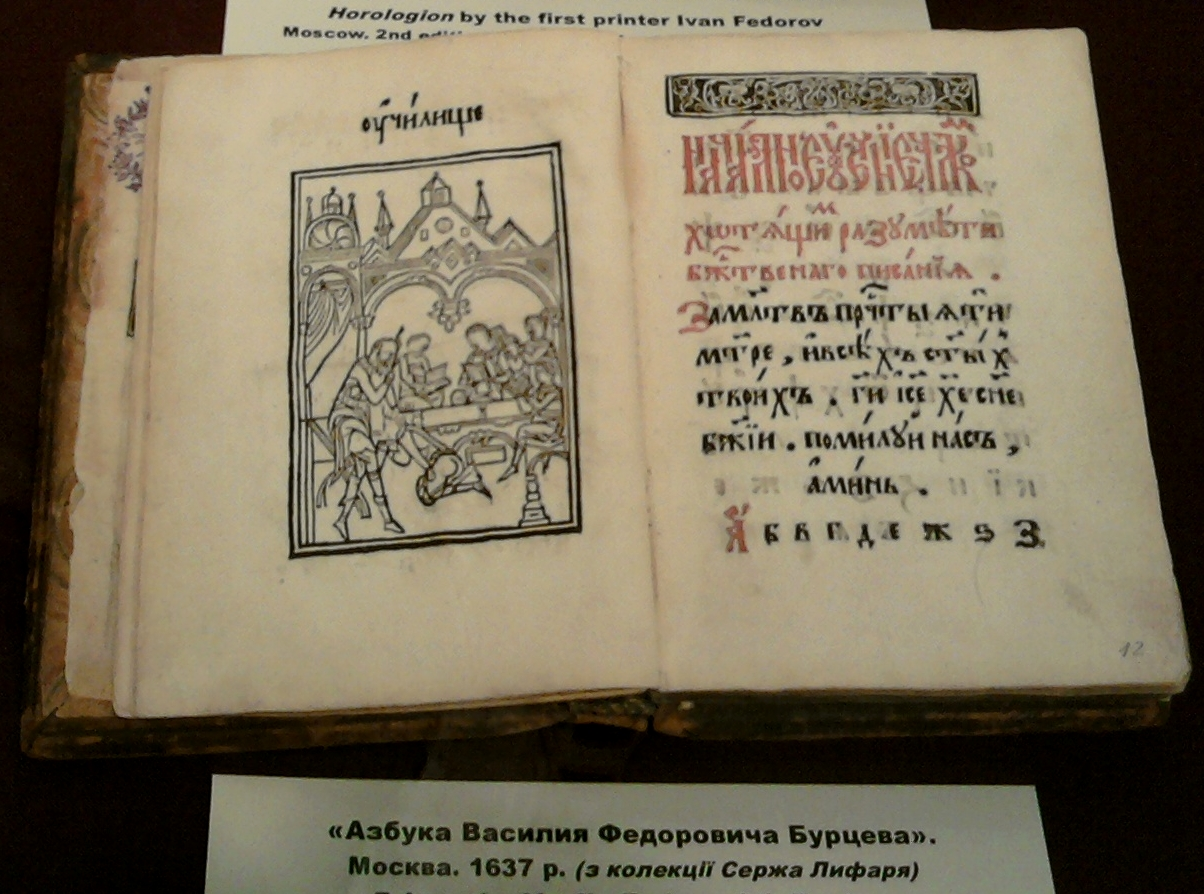
An alphabet book from Moscow in 1637

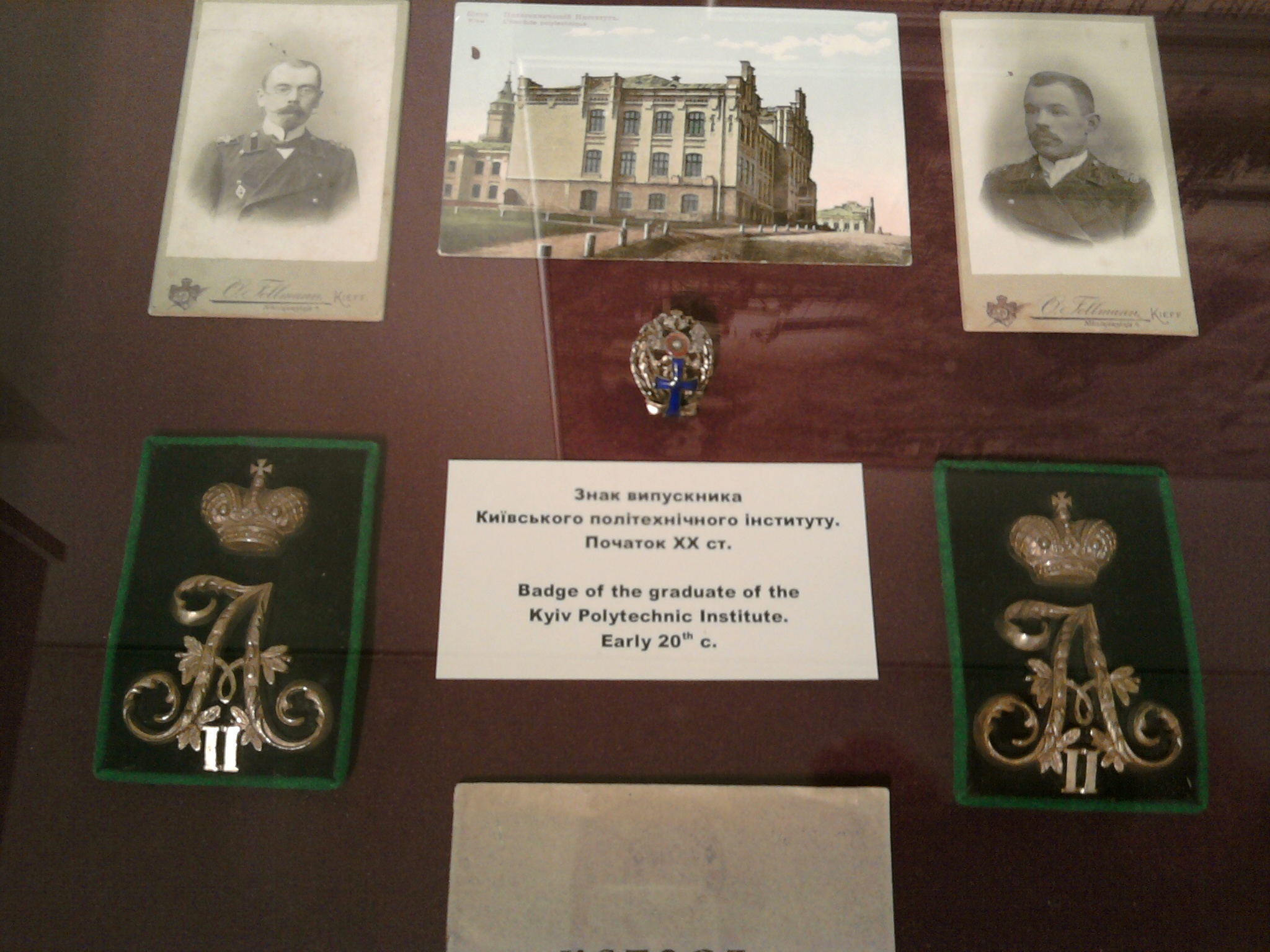
KPI Graduate Badge

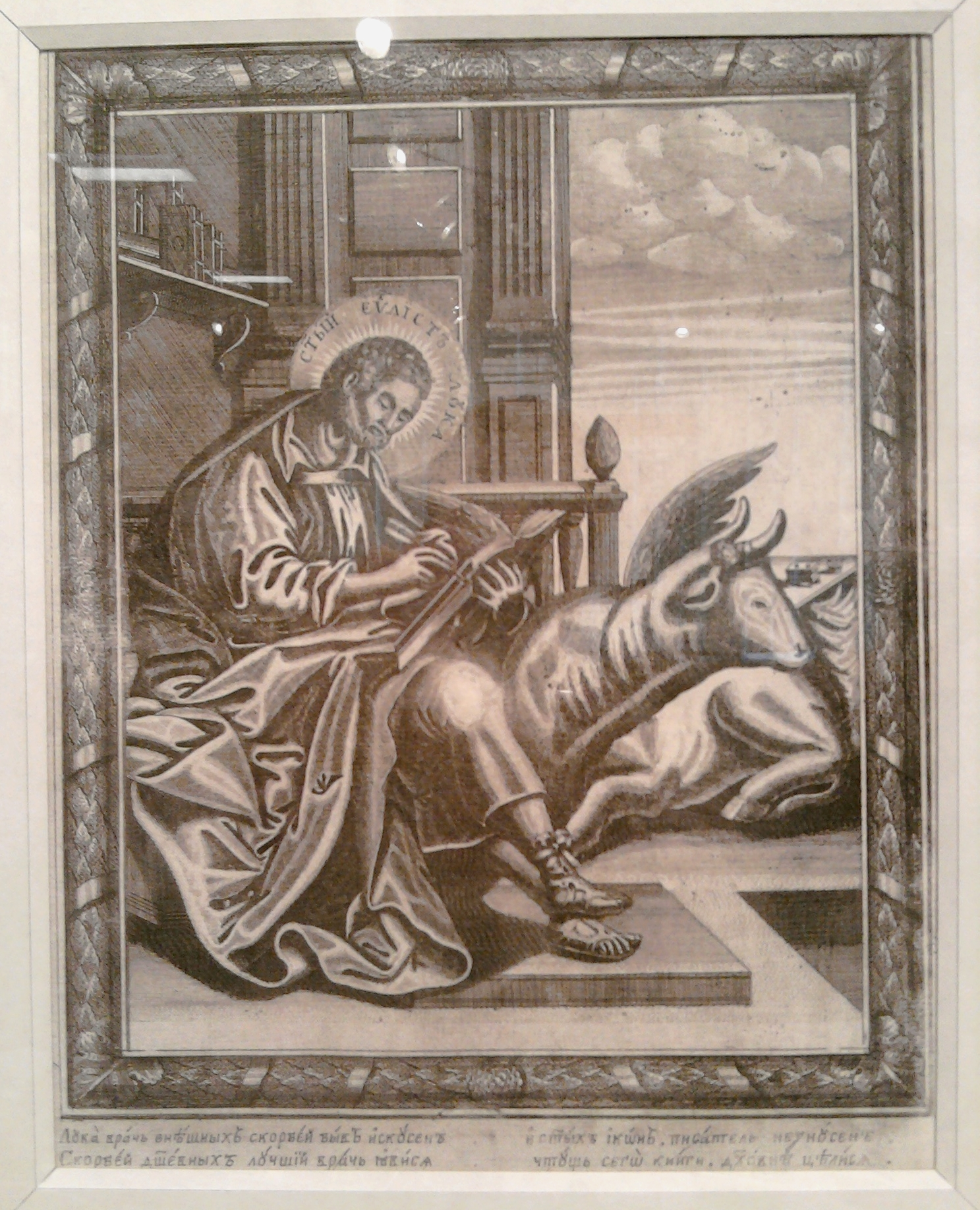
A religious painting

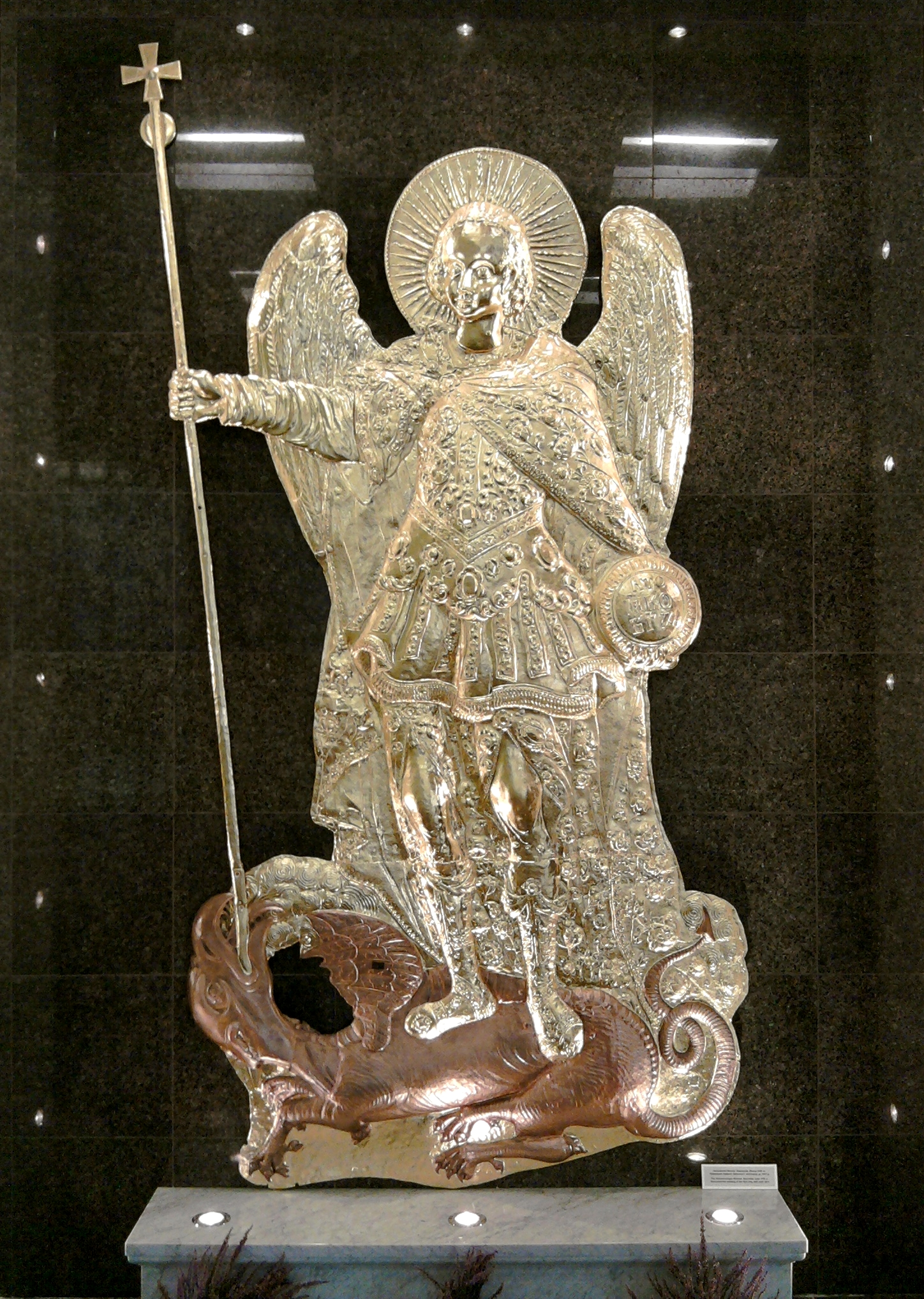
Sculture of Archangel Michael

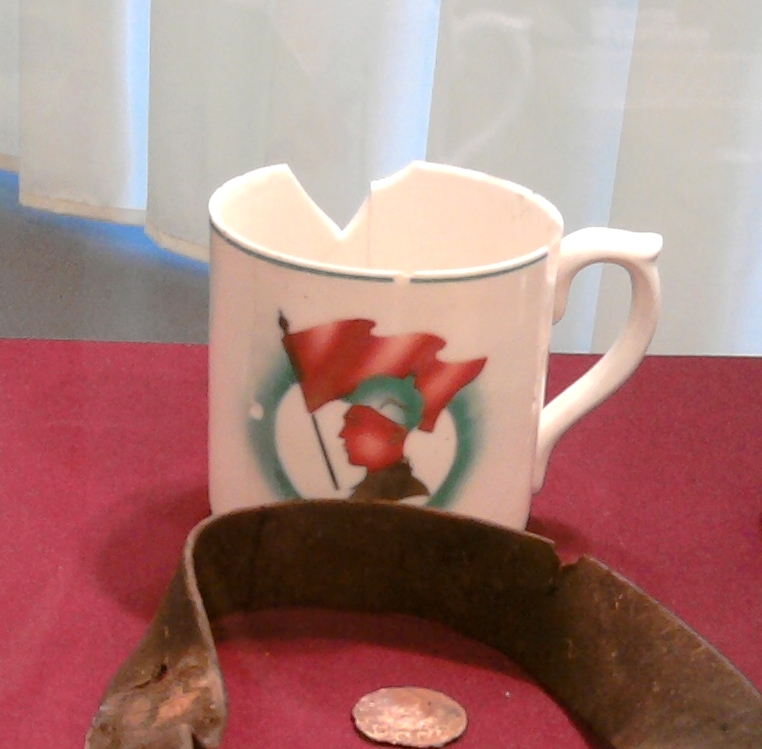
A cup from the Bykivnia graves

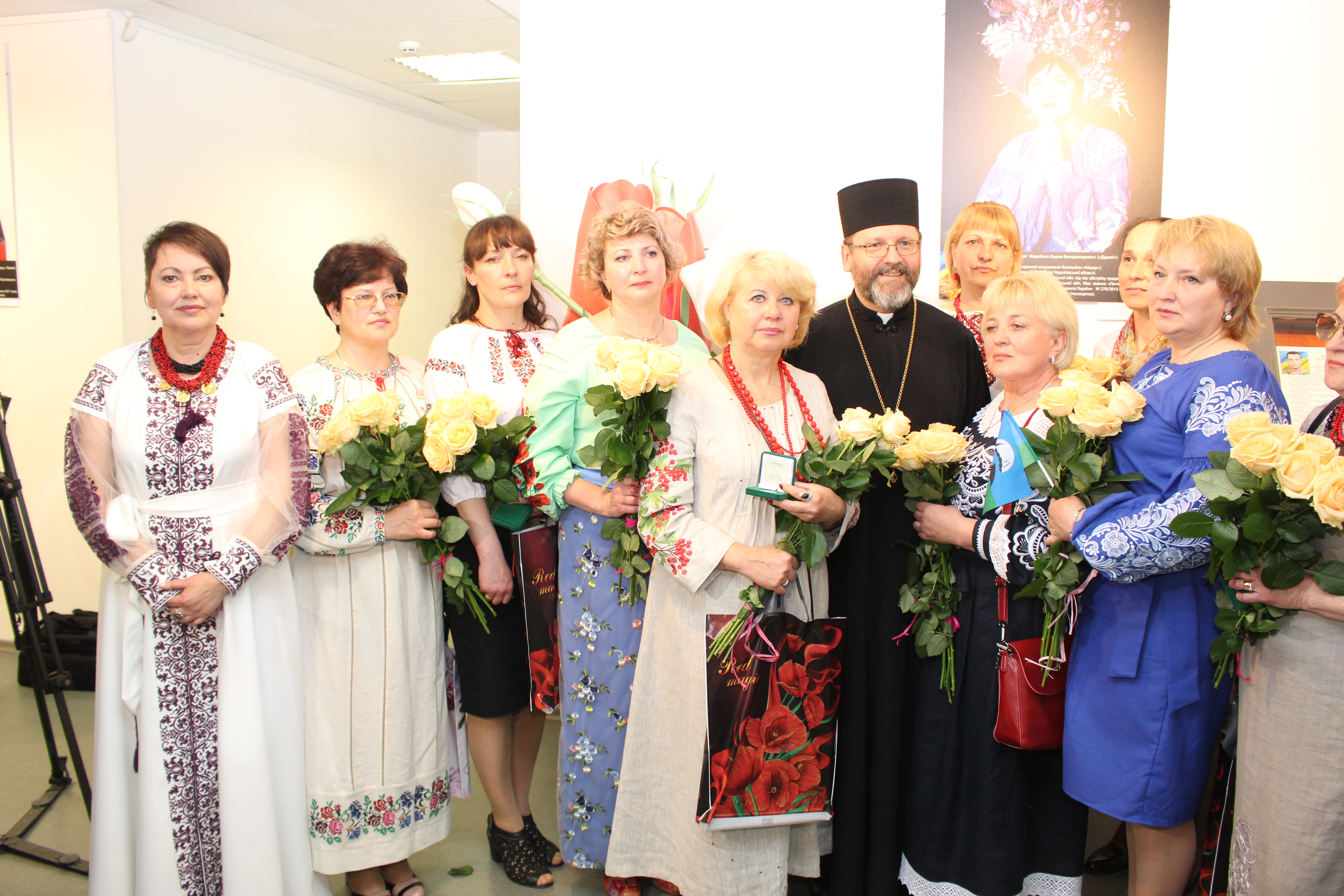
Opening of an exhibit dedicated to the fallen soldiers in the War in Donbas

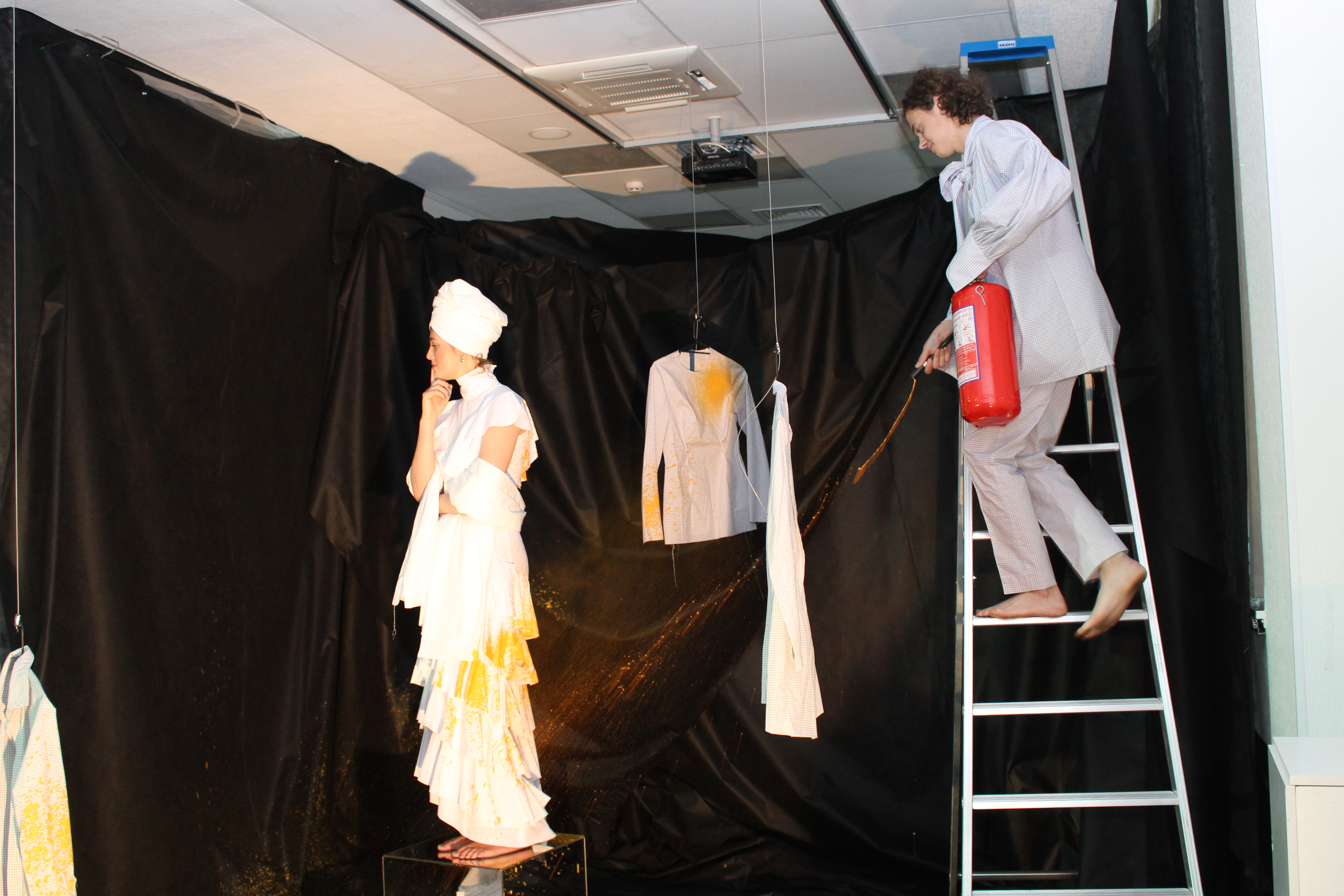
Performance of "Black Commander" as part of "Kyiv art week"

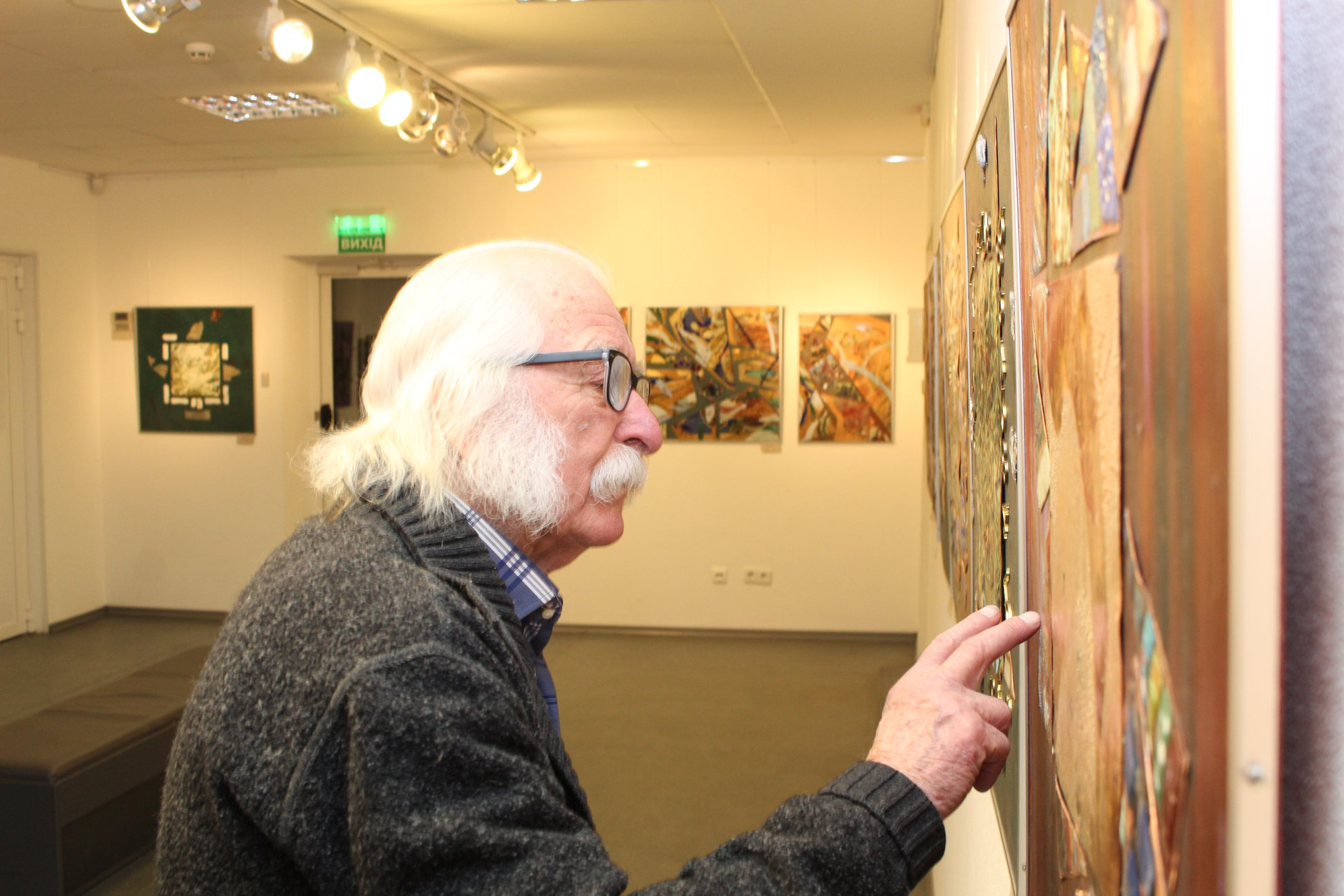
Ivan Marchuk at the opening of an exhibition

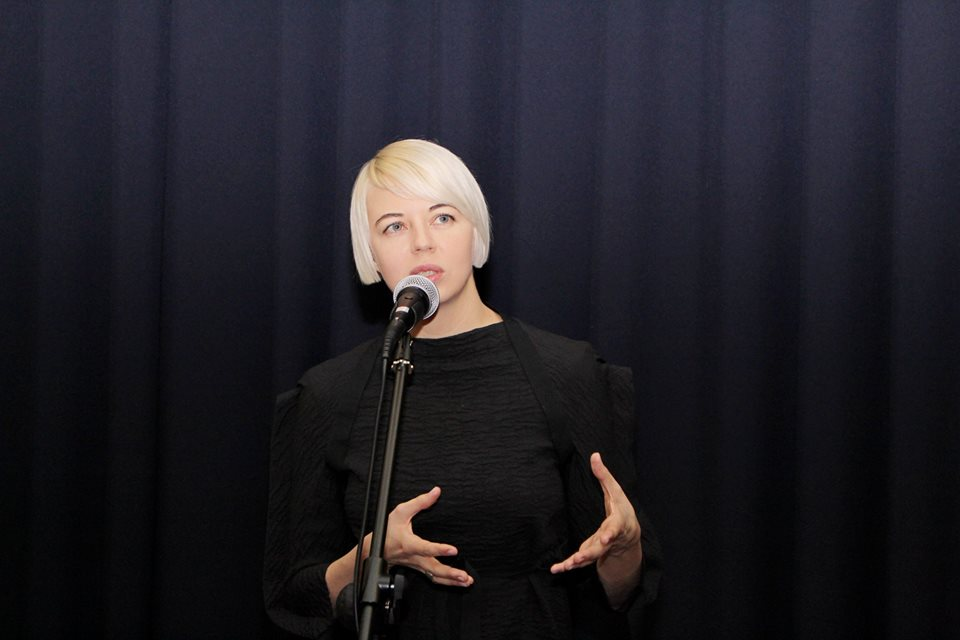
The singer of Onuka performing at an exhibition

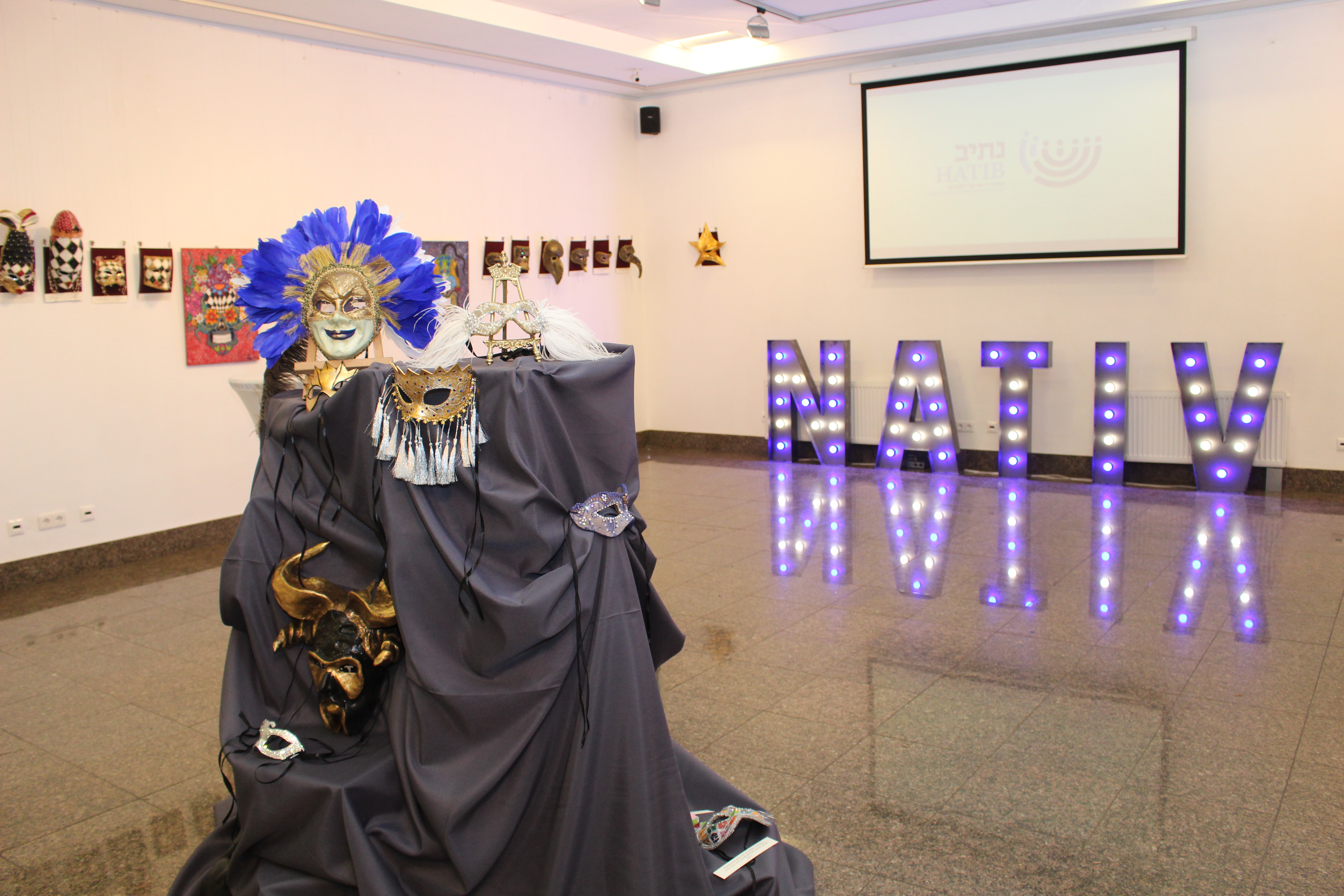
An exhibition about Purim spiel

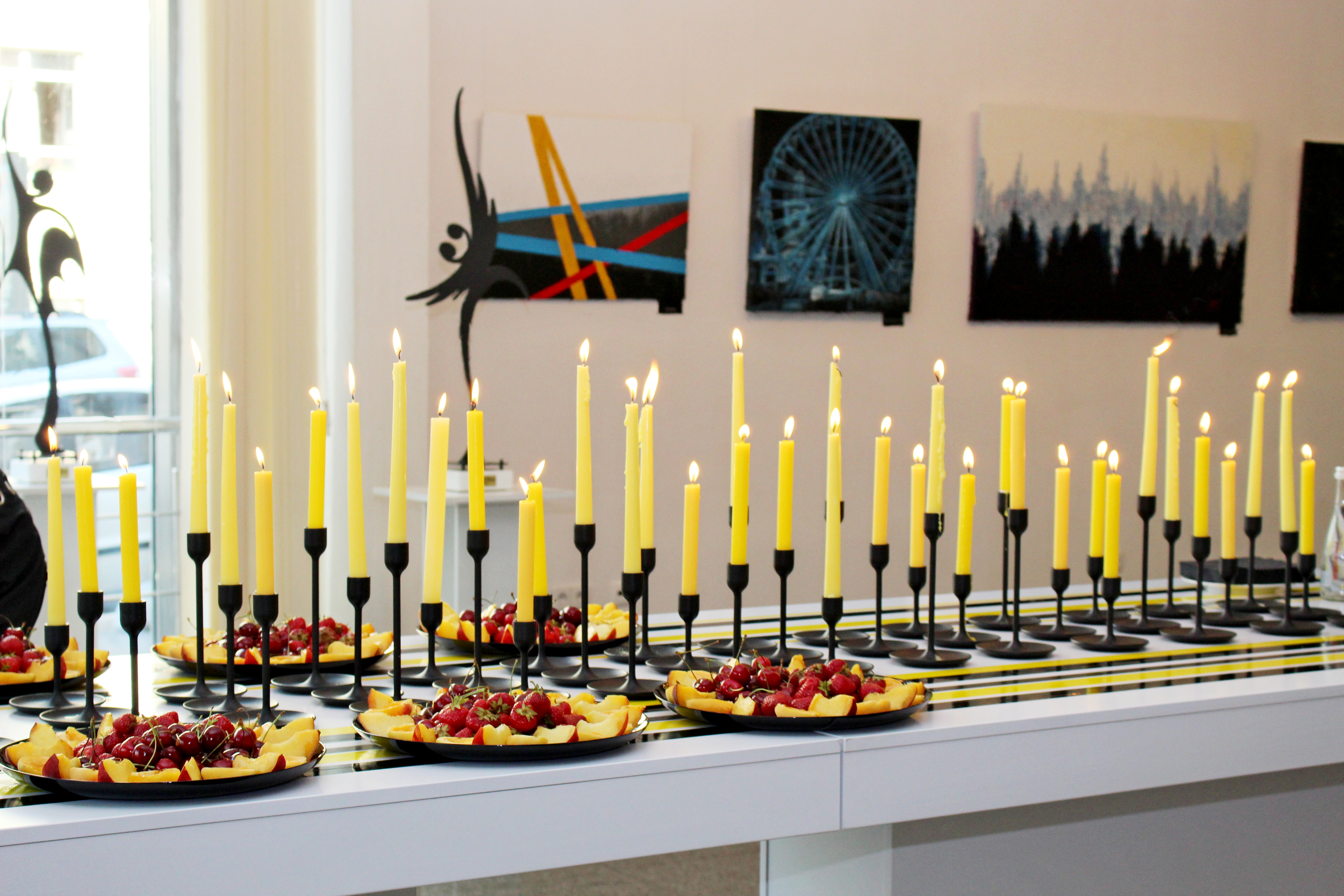
Ukrainian-Lebanese exhibition "Triumph of the black color"

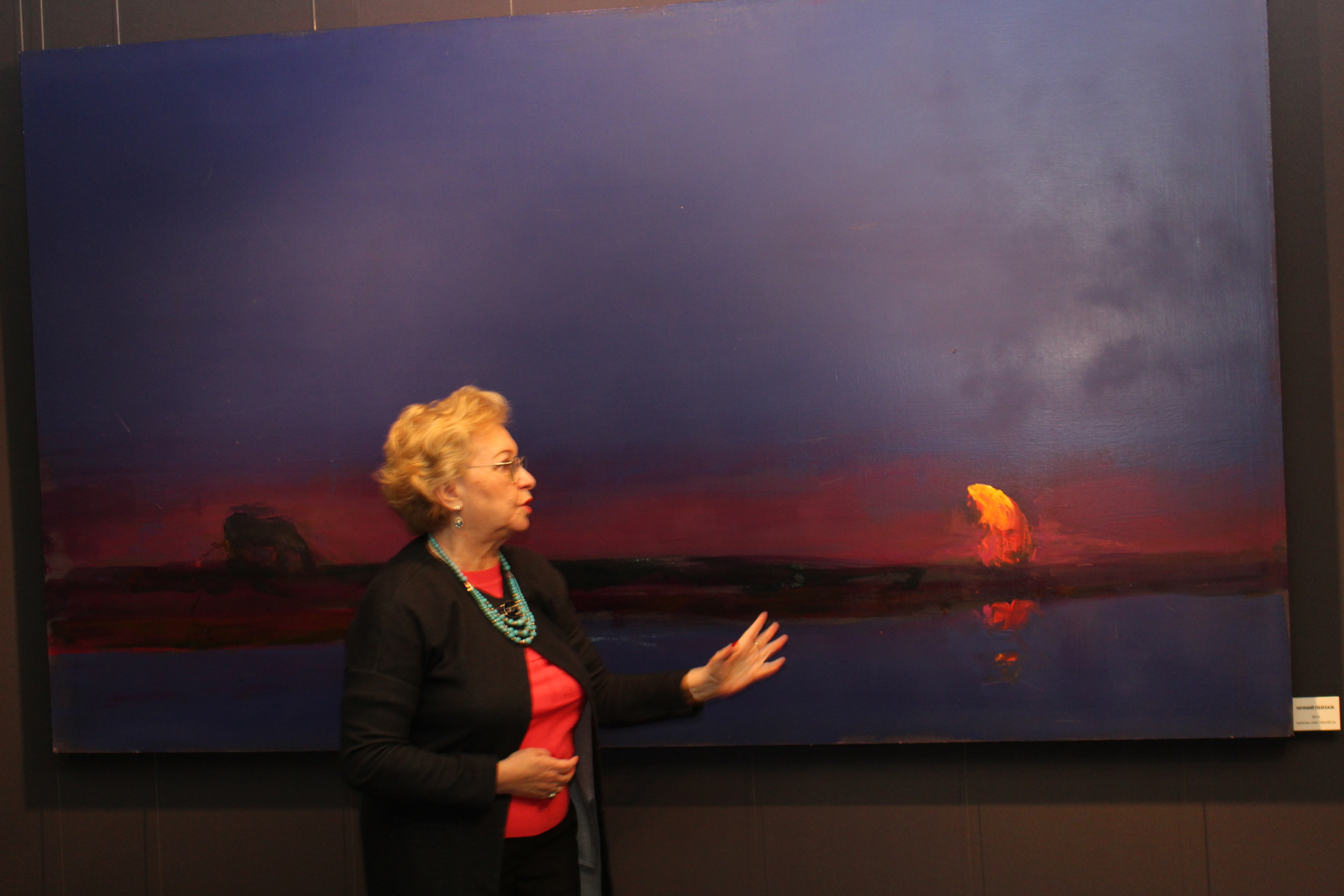
Art critic Hanna Vladimirska at the opening of an exhibition

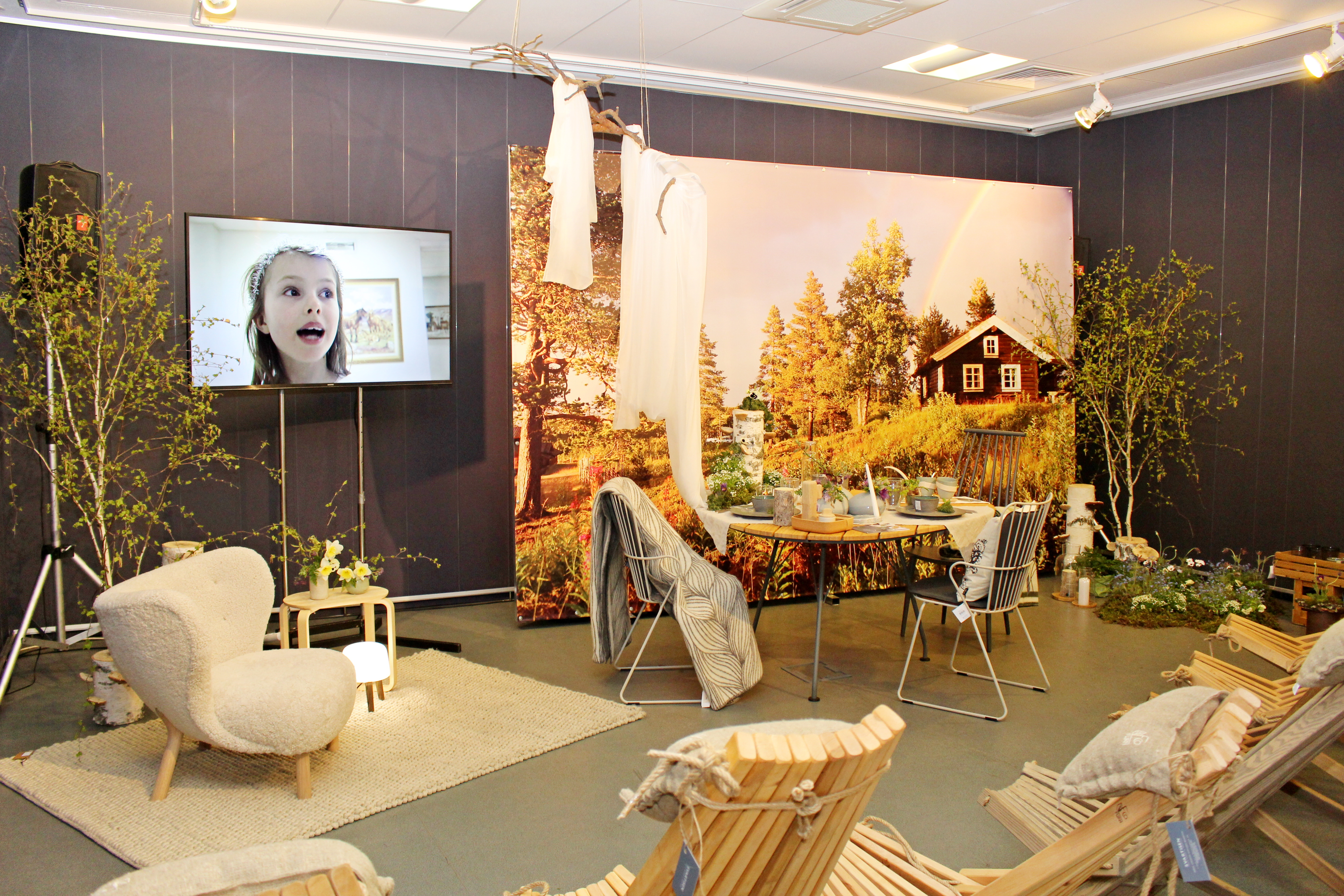
Festival of "Scandinavian Night"

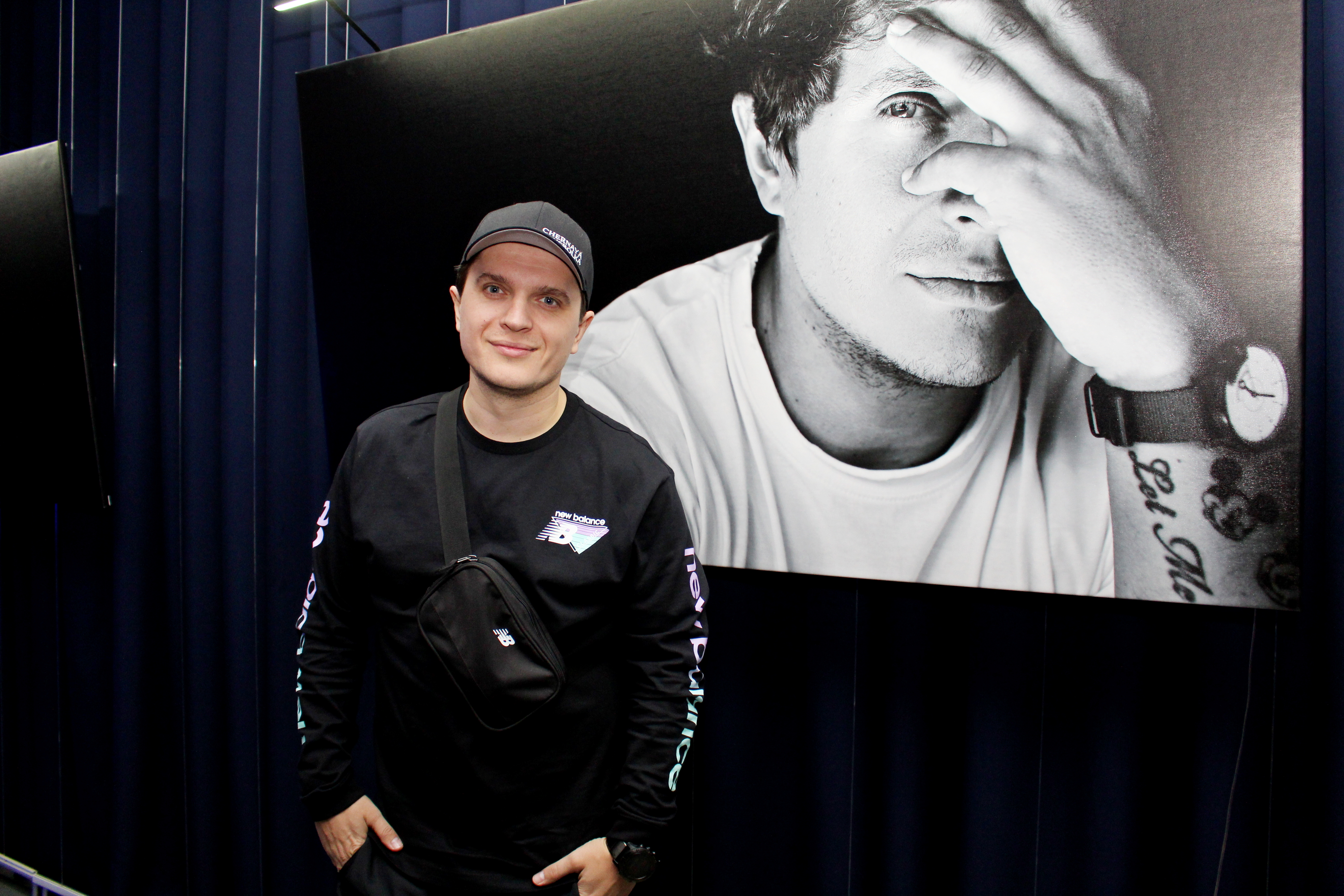
TV presenter Uncle Vanya at the opening of a photo exhibition

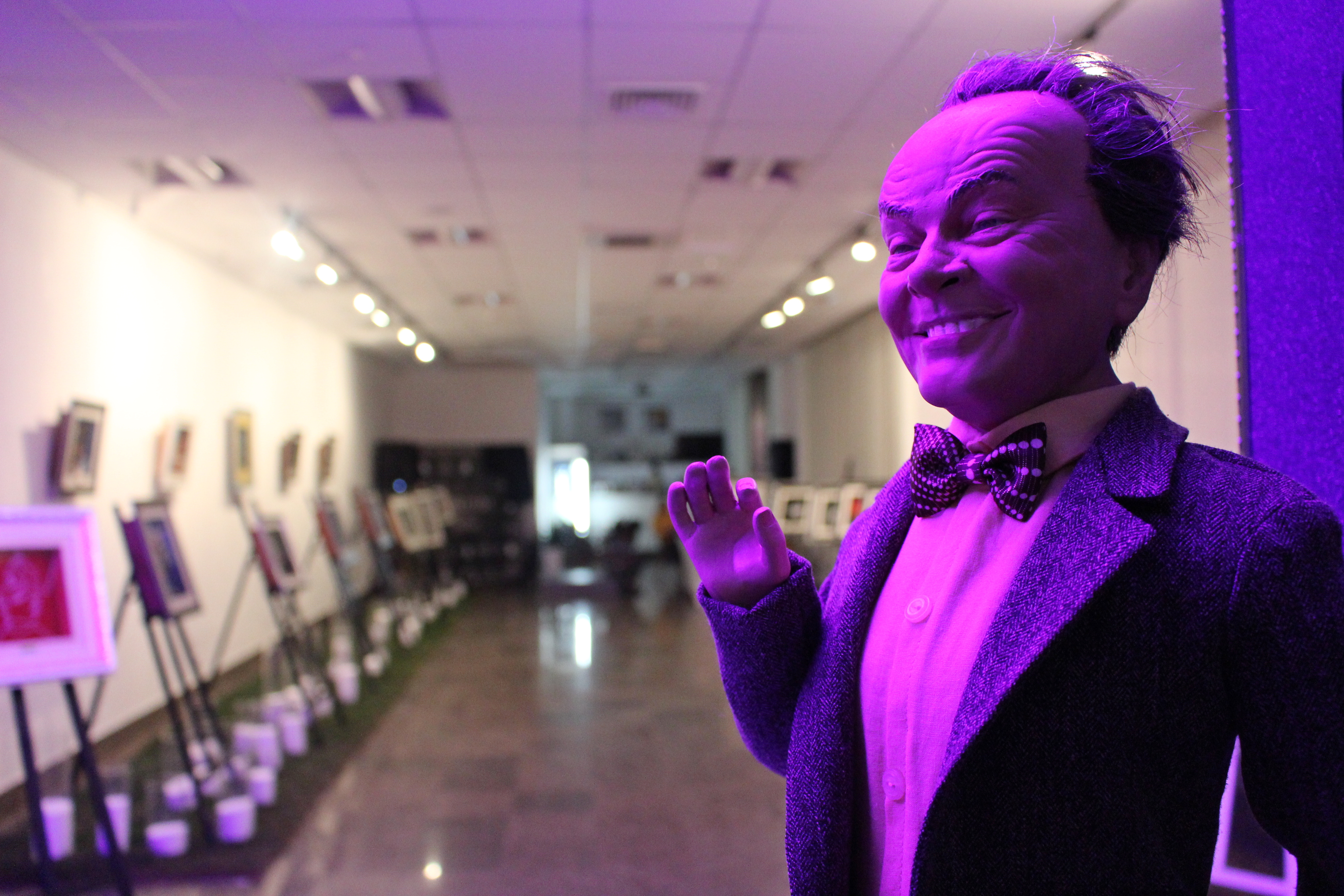
A doll of Jack Nicholson at an exhibition

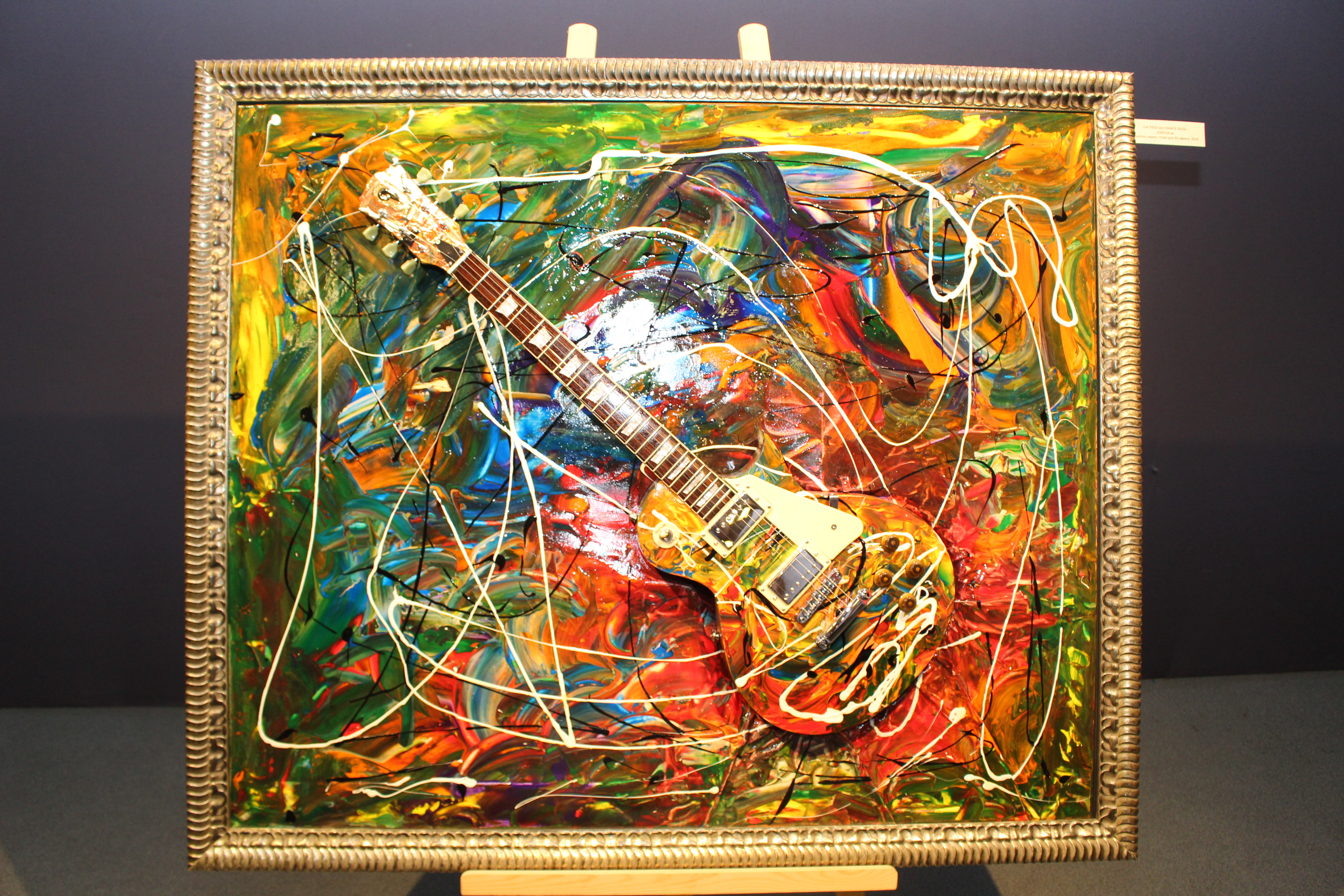
A painting of painter Claudio Rosati at an exhibition

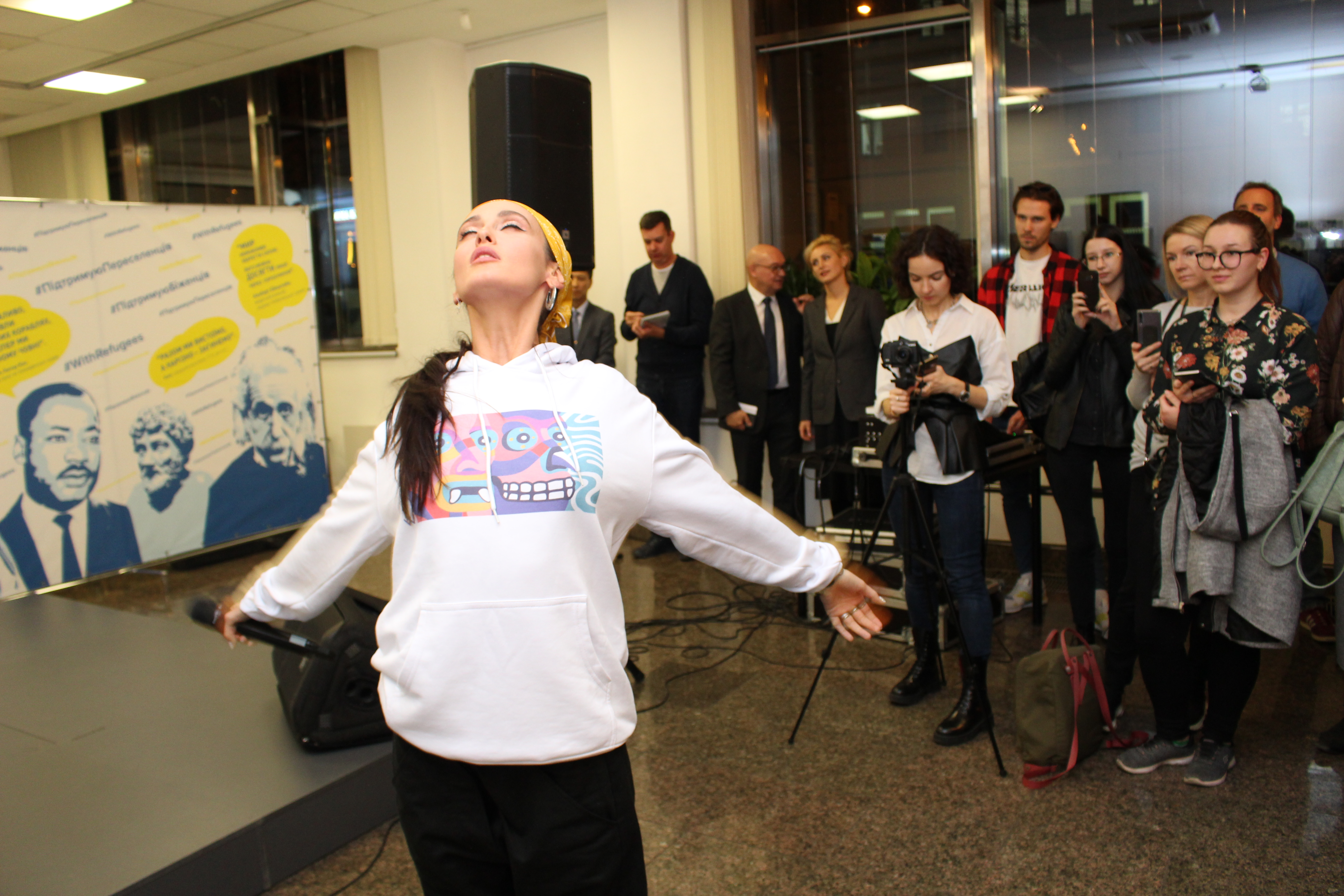
Singer Alina Pash performing at a UN exhibition dedicated to stateless people

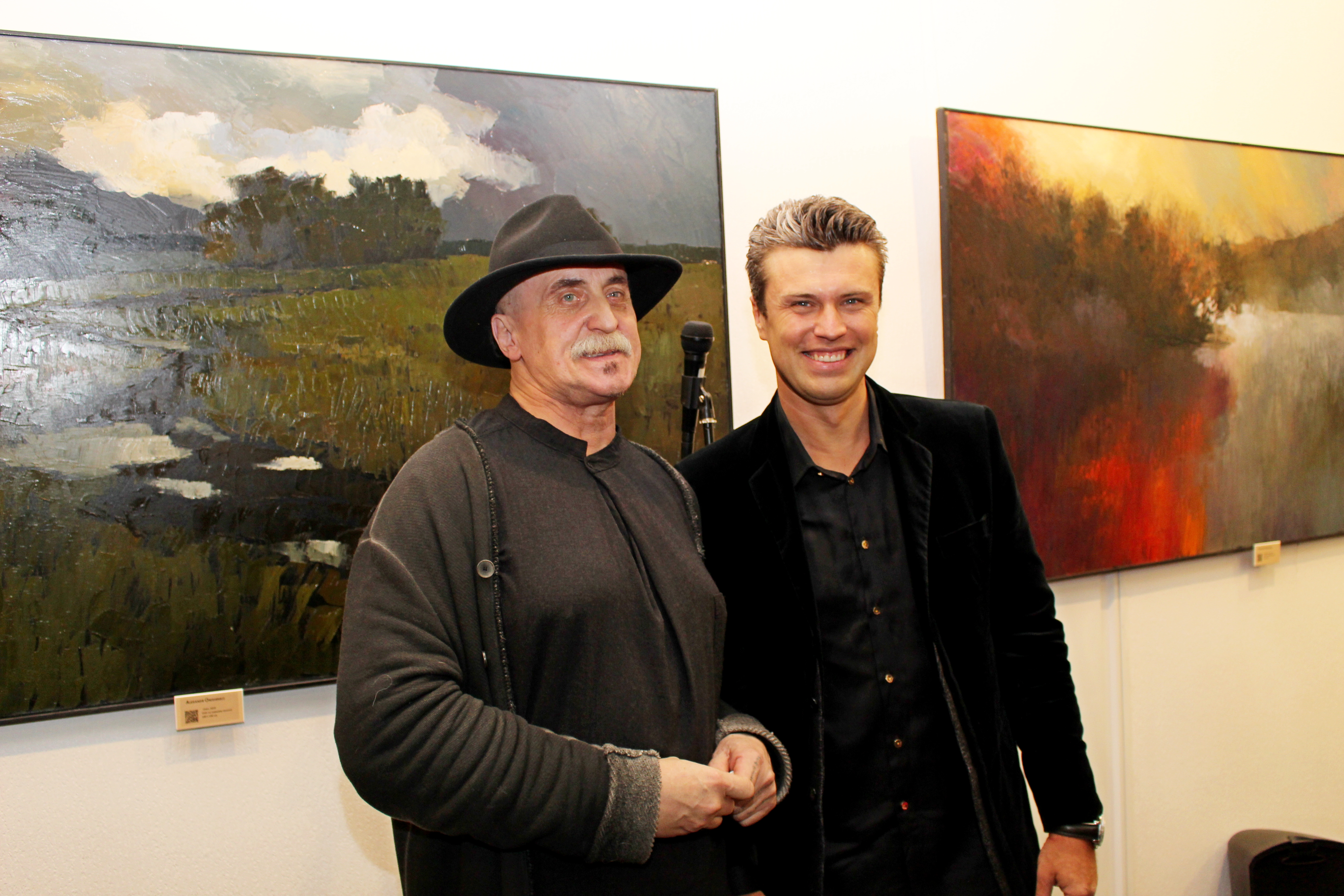
Composer Evgeny Khmara at the opening of an exhibition

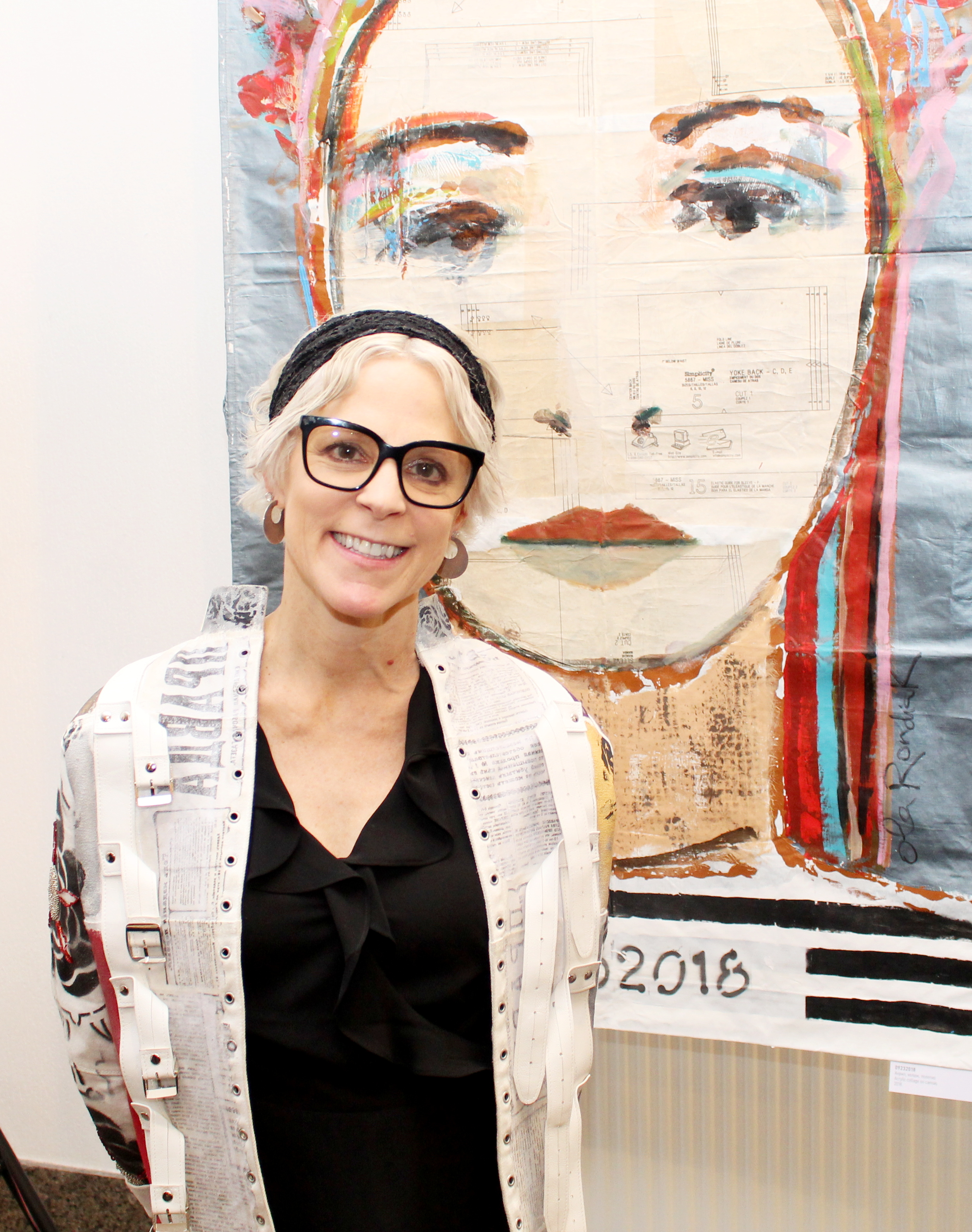
Ukrainian-American painter Ola Rondiak at the opening of an exhibition "Metamorphosis"
