= Dinah Kaye =

Scottish jazz singer (1924–2011)

- Born: Catherine Sophia Cumming; 2 February 1924; Burma, British India
- Died: 12 September 2011 (aged 87) Edinburgh, Scotland
- Genres: Jazz
- Occupation: Singer
- Years active: 1943–1965

Dinah Kaye-Cumming (born Catherine Sophia Cumming; 2 February 1924 – 12 September 2011) was a Scottish jazz singer. Born in Burma to Scottish parents, she spent her childhood entering singing competitions in Edinburgh and later moved to London to further her career. Kaye gained interest after performing the song "Jealous Eyes" and toured the Americas in the 1950s, before returning to London to relaunch her career. She represented the United Kingdom at the 1962 Sopot Jazz Festival, as well as touring the globe.

== Biography ==
Kaye was born Catherine Sophia Cumming in Burma to Scottish parents on 2 February 1924. She had one brother, John. Her family moved back to Scotland when Kaye was five years old and settled in Edinburgh. Her childhood was spent entering singing competitions and was regularly seen in Edinburgh's jazz clubs, with local bands, to earn money. Kaye moved to London in 1943 and became the resident singer for Harry Parry and his orchestra. She toured with him for several years, before leaving the band to become a freelance artist, and spent the next two years in the Netherlands. After returning to London, Kaye resided at Fischer's jazz club, and regularly performed at the Savoy Club, the Café de Paris, and Coconut Group. She was highly sought after, and sang with famous bands of the era, including those led by Nat Allen, Cyril Stapleton, Tommy Sampson and Terry Lightfoot.

Vocalist Edmundo Ros selected Kaye to record with him for Decca Records and performed the song "Jealous Eyes". The song generated much interest, and Kaye signed with Decca as a solo artist. She recorded her first album for the label, entitled Just Another Polka. Singer Billy Daniels became interested in Kaye after listening to her album, signing her and announcing plans to prepare the vocalist for her first appearance in the United States in New York City. Kaye left the United Kingdom for New York City on 14 September 1953, and spent the next four years in the United States, appearing alongside singer Louis Armstrong, with whom she established a friendship. She acted as supporting singer to Tony Bennett, Lena Horne and Kay Starr and travelled extensively across the country and Canada, which saw her become established in the American show business scene.

After her four-year tour, Kaye returned to the United Kingdom and relaunched her career in London. She performed in restaurants and night clubs, although she had problems when she was due to sing "Please Do It Again" in January 1960; the performance was later authorised by the BBC when it became satisfied with her interpretation of its performance for broadcast on a radio programme aimed at teenagers. Clarinettist Acker Bilk organised a party for Kaye in July 1962 before she travelled to Poland in the same month to represent the United Kingdom at the Sopot Jazz Festival. There, she sang new lyrics to the Bilk song "Stranger on the Shore", her personal selection to go alongside a Polish song and one from the United Kingdom. She was awarded a silver medal after the gig was secured for her by her agent. Kaye toured globally in the 1950s and 1960s, receiving a positive reception where she performed. Her popularity meant Kaye was ranked second behind Cleo Laine in a 1965 Melody Maker Jazz Poll. She frequently broadcast on the BBC and in the countries she visited.

Kaye died in Edinburgh on 12 September 2011, at the age of 87.

== Discography ==
- The Roaring 20's (1963)
