= National Academy of Management =

College in Kyiv, Ukraine

Coordinates: 50°25′49.2″N 30°26′49.9″E

- Type: Private
- Established: 1992
- Rector: Serhiy Erokhin
- Administrative staff: 200
- Students: about 2000
- Location: Kyiv, Ukraine
- Website: nam.kiev.ua

The National Academy of Management (Ukrainian: Національна академія управління, romanized: Natsionalna akademiia upravlinnia) is a higher educational establishment in Kyiv, Ukraine. It was founded in 1992.

== Majors ==
- Finances;
- Banking;
- Accounting and Audit;
- Marketing;
- Law;
- Intelligence systems of decision-making (in economics and business).
