= Dina Vakil =

Indian journalist (born 1946)

- Born: 1946 (age 79–80); Mumbai (Bombay)
- Education: Mount Holyoke College, Columbia School of Journalism
- Occupations: journalist, editor
- Known for: First female resident editor of The Times of India, Bombay edition

Dina Vakil (born 1946) is an Indian journalist based in Mumbai (formerly called Bombay). In 1993, Vakil became the first-ever woman resident editor of The Times of India Bombay edition, which was the country's most widely circulated newspaper at that time.

== Biography ==
After graduating in history in Massachusetts from Mt Holyoke College, in 1969, Vakil enrolled at the Columbia School of Journalism in New York City and finished her graduate degree in 1970. Subsequently, she worked with the United Nations Development Programme (UNDP) before returning to India.

=== Career ===
In Bombay, Vakil accepted positions with several publishers to gain valuable experience, including the details about editorial operations and day-to-day production.

After moving to The Times of India, Vakil was assigned editorial work ranging at first from novice to increasingly important levels, "eventually positioning herself for a pioneering leadership appointment." Her skills demonstrated her ability to manage the pressing needs of a major city newspaper faced with urgent and conflicting demands yet also keeping clear editorial messages.

She became a history-making figure in 1993, when she was named the first woman resident editor of The Times of India’s Bombay edition. Her appointment was seen as a fundamental expansion in the number of careers that had become reachable by women despite the restrictions that had been exerted in a traditional male-dominated organization. By occupying a decision-making role, Vakil was able to shape coverage and personally influence the working culture of The Times.

In later years, she was able to keep the Bombay edition competitive and relevant. She helped to modernize the publishing business even as she met the daily challenges of operating the flagship daily. Over the years, Vakil's name has "continued to appear in accounts of editorial leadership and the changing status of women in the industry."
