= Dino Abazović =

Bosnian sociologist

- Born: 1972 (age 53–54); Sarajevo, SFR Yugoslavia
- Education: University of Sarajevo
- Occupations: Sociologist, Scholar
- Known for: Post-conflict studies; politics and religion
- Website: dinoabazovic.com

Dino Abazović (born 1972) is a sociologist and Full Professor at the University of Sarajevo, Bosnia and Herzegovina.

== Biography ==
He studied sociology at the Faculty of Political Science in Sarajevo where he graduated in 1999. He earned his post-graduate degree from the same institution in 2005 with a thesis on the sociological determination of religious nationalism. In 2009 he earned his PhD with a thesis on the subject of Bosnian Muslims between secularization and desecularization. In 2012 he was named Centennial Professor and head of the Center for Interdisciplinary Postgraduate Studies at the Faculty of Political Science in Sarajevo, lecturing on the subjects of World Religions, Religion and Conflict, Religion and Politics and the Sociology of Moralism. In 2015 he was named Co-Supervisor of the PhD Program at the Oxford Center for Mission Studies in partnership with Middlesex University London, as well as an External Examiner for the PhD program at the University of Salzburg's Faculty of Political Science. He is a board member of the Graz-based Contemporary Southeastern Europe Foundation and a Member of the editorial board of the Odjek arts and humanities journal. He is one of the founders of the Open University of Sarajevo. In 2017, he signed the Declaration on the Common Language of the Croats, Serbs, Bosniaks and Montenegrins.

== Selected bibliography ==
- Za naciju i boga – Sociološko određenje religijskog nacionalizma, UNSA, Sarajevo 2006.
- Religije sveta (co-authored by Jelena Radojković and Milan Vukmanović, Beogradski centar za ljudska prava, Belgrade 2007.
- Religija u tranziciji: Eseji o religijskom i političkom, Rabic, Sarajevo 2010.
- Bosanskohercegovački muslimani između sekularizacije i desekularizacije, Synopsis, Zagreb-Sarajevo 2012.
- Kratki uvod u problem političke volje: Studija slučaja Bosne i Hercegovine, Friedrich Ebert Stiftung, Sarajevo 2015.
