= Dina Litovsky =

Ukrainian-born contemporary photographer

- Діна Літовська
- Born: December 17, 1979 (age 46); Donetsk, Ukrainian SSR, Soviet Union (now Ukraine)
- Occupation: Photographer
- Website: dinalitovsky.com

Dina Litovsky (Note: Ukrainian: Діна Літовська, romanized: Dina Litovska) (born 1979) is a photographer who has lived in New York City, New York since 1991.

== Early life and education ==
Litovsky was born in Donetsk, Ukrainian SSR, Soviet Union (now Ukraine). She moved to New York City in 1991, where she studied psychology at New York University. She describes herself as a non-religious Jewish Ukrainian. In 2010, she got her MFA graduate degree in photography from the School of Visual Arts in New York.

== Photography ==
Litovsky's work can be described as visual sociology and as documenting the "social dynamics of the American culture." She often focuses on subcultures and the idea of leisure. Her series Dark City is an Edward Hopper-influenced, cinematic portrait of New York City during the COVID-19 pandemic. That work has been described as "Photos of a disorienting New York in lockdown." Where the Amish Vacation is about Amish and Mennonite travelers kicking back in Sarasota, Florida. Meatpacking is about the sexual politics of New York City's Meatpacking district. Fashion Lust is backstage and front row fashion week in New York City, Paris and London. Bachelorette is an intimate look into the modern ritual of the bachelorette party. Untag this Photo is concerned with the influence of iPhone cameras and social networks on public behavior of young women in nightclubs.

Her work has been featured in The New York Times, National Geographic, New York Magazine, Photo District News (PDN), Esquire, The New Yorker, and Wired.

== Awards and recognition ==
- 2014: PDN 30 New and Emerging Photographers to watch
- 2020: Winner, Nannen Prize, a German award for documentary photography
