= Deena =

- Language(s): English

Origin
- Word/name: Hebrew
- Meaning: judged, justified, vindicated

Deena is a given name that is mainly feminine, but sometimes masculine.

Deena is a name of Hebrew origin, meaning 'judged', 'justified', or 'vindicated'. It is a feminine name that is often used as a short form of the name Dinah. The name Deena is often associated with the biblical character Dinah, daughter of Jacob and Leah. Despite what multiple sources say, there is no record of the name Deena meaning “valley”.

Some notables name Deena include:

Women:

- Deena Aljuhani Abdulaziz (born 1975), Saudi Arabian princess
- Deena Deardurff (born 1957), American retired swimmer
- Deena Dill, American actress and executive producer
- Deena Horst, American politician, member of the Kansas House of Representatives (1995–2010)
- Deena Kastor (born 1973), American long-distance runner
- Deena Brush Mapple (born 1960), American retired water skier
- Deena Mehta (born 1961), Indian businesswoman, first woman president of the Bombay Stock Exchange
- Deena M. Mistri (1925–2011), Pakistani educator
- Diane Deena Payne (born 1954), English actress
- Deena Weinstein (born 1943), American professor of sociology
- Deena (singer) (fl. 2015–present), stage name of Deena Herr, a German singer performing in Uganda

Men:

- Deena Nath Singh Yadav ,(fl. 1991–present) Indian politician
- Deena Ram (born 1964), Indian male former steeplechase runner

== Fictional characters ==
Deena Schuster, a character in 2012 American comedy film Wanderlust

== See also ==
- Dena (given name)
- Dheena, an Indian film
- Dinah
