= Dinah Gamon =

British artist

- Occupation: Silversmith

Dinah Gamon (née Tillett) was an English silversmith.

Gamon was married to largeworker John Gamon at St Stephen Walbrook on 28 May 1726; with him she had two sons, William and John. After her husband's death she registered a mark of her own on 6 March 1740, giving a London address in Staining Lane near Goldsmiths' Hall. Her classification was that of largeworker, like her husband.

A George II creamer of 1743 by Gamon is owned by the National Museum of Women in the Arts, while a punch ladle of 1740-41 is in the collection of the Minneapolis Institute of Arts. During her career she also produced a number of pieces of communion plate.
