= Cleeve Hill SSSI, Somerset =

Protected area in Somerset, England

Cleeve Hill
- Site of Special Scientific Interest
- Location within Somerset
- Location of Cleeve Hill.
- Area of search: Somerset
- Grid reference: ST056428
- Coordinates: 51.17662°N 3.35181°W
- Interest: Biological
- Area: 15.1 hectares (0.151 km^{2}; 0.058 sq mi)
- Notification date: 1989

Cleeve Hill (grid reference ST056428) is a 15.1 hectare (37.4 acre) biological Site of Special Scientific Interest between Old Cleeve and Watchet in Somerset, notified in 1989.

The site covers a moderate to steeply sloping south face of the valley of the Washford River. It supports a rich and diverse calcareous grassland community with associated mixed woodland and scrub. The site contains two species of plant which are nationally rare in Great Britain, Nit-grass (Gastridium ventricosum) and Rough Marsh-mallow (Althaea hirsuta).
