= Daw's Castle =

Hillfort in Somerset, England

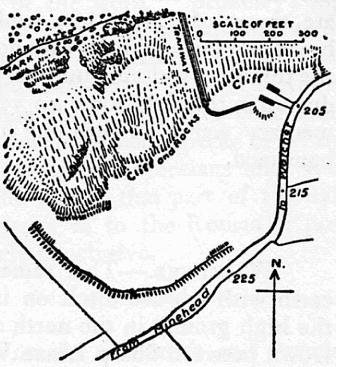
- Plan of earthworks at Daw's Castle

- Location within Somerset
- 51°10′53″N 3°20′39″W
- Location: Watchet, Somerset, England

History
- Built: Iron Age

Site notes
- Area: 2 hectares (4.9 acres)

Scheduled monument
- Official name: Daw's Castle
- Designated: 17 January 1969
- Reference no.: 1020882

Daw's Castle (or Dart's Castle or Dane's Castle) is a sea cliff hillfort just west of Watchet, a harbour town in Somerset, England. It is a Scheduled Monument.

The name comes from Thomas Dawe, who owned castell field in 1537.

The fort is situated on an east-west cliff about 80 metres (260 ft) above the sea, on a tapering spur of land bounded by the Washford River to the south, as it flows to the sea at Watchet, about 1 km east. The ramparts of the fort would have formed a semicircle backing on to the sheer cliffs, but coastal erosion has reduced the size of the enclosure, and later destruction by farming, limekilns, and the B3191 road, have left only about 300 metres (980 ft) of ramparts visible today.

The fort may be of Iron Age origin, but was rebuilt and fortified as a burh by King Alfred, as part of his defense against Viking raids from the Bristol Channel around 878 AD. It would have been one of a chain of forts and coastal lookout posts, connected by the Herepath, or military road, which allowed Alfred to move his army along the coast, covering Viking movements at sea.

Excavations have revealed a first phase of defence with a mortared wall fronting an earth bank from this period. Then a second phase of defence in late 9th or early 10th centuries, also against Viking invaders.

In the Burghal Hidage of 919, nearby Watchet is attributed 513 hides, which converts to a defensive perimeter of 645 m. It is not clear whether this refers to the walls of the town, or of Daw's Castle high on the cliff above.

The Anglo-Saxon Chronicle records a Viking raid on Watchet in 914, but they were defeated with great slaughter ... so that few of them came away, except those only who swam out to the ships.

There was a plundering raid in 987, and another in 997, with much evil wrought in burning and manslaughter.

A Saxon mint was established at Watchet in 1035, and this was probably within the fort, rather than in the town below.

== See also ==
- List of hillforts and ancient settlements in Somerset
- Battle of Cynwit
