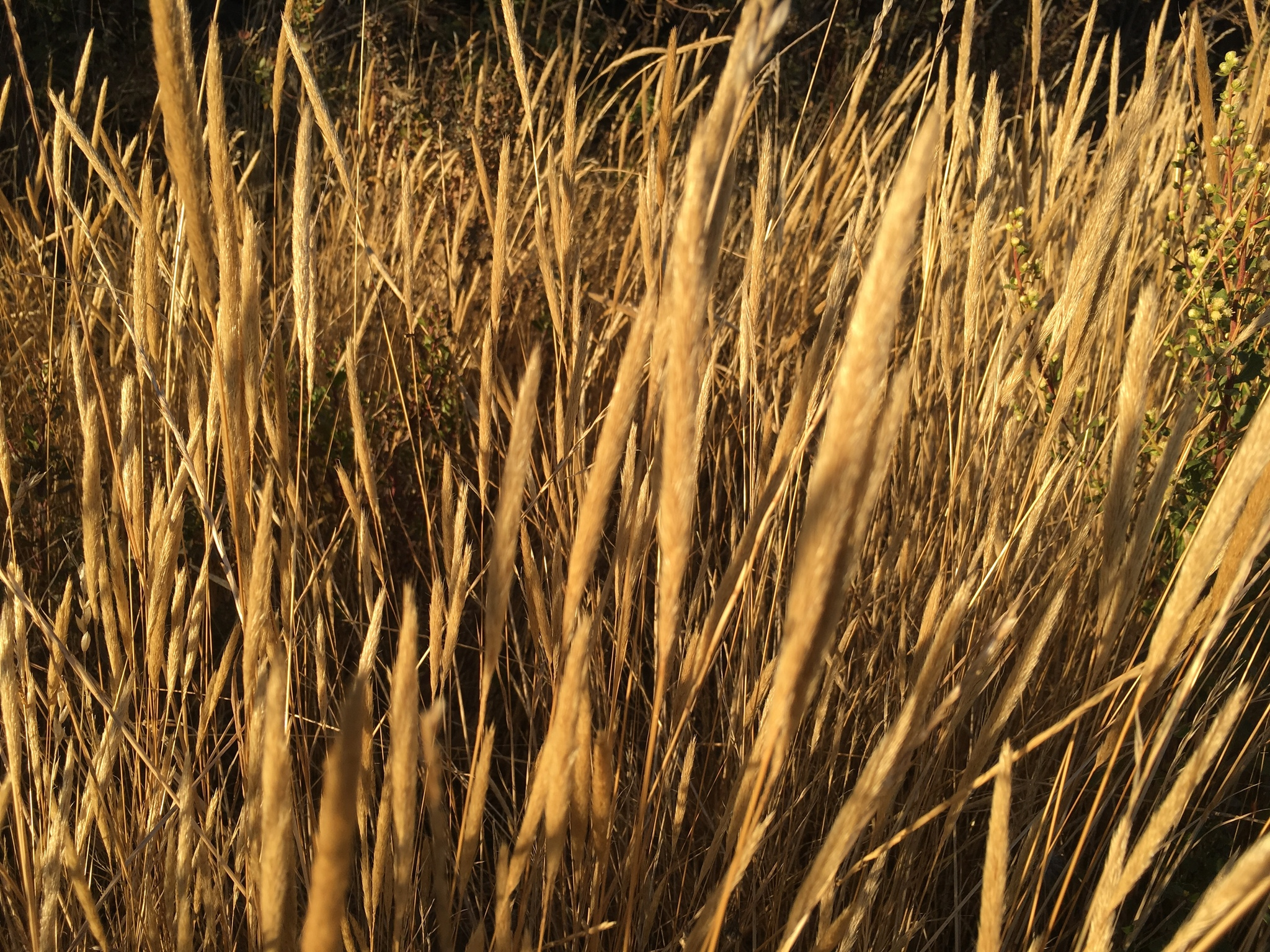
- Gastridium phleoides

Scientific classification
- Kingdom: Plantae
- Clade: Tracheophytes
- Clade: Angiosperms
- Clade: Monocots
- Clade: Commelinids
- Order: Poales
- Family: Poaceae
- Subfamily: Pooideae
- Supertribe: Poodae
- Tribe: Poeae
- Subtribe: Agrostidinae
- Genus: Gastridium; P.Beauv.

Type species
- Gastridium australe (syn. of G. ventricosum) (L.) P.Beauv.

= Gastridium =

Genus of grasses

Gastridium is a genus of plants in the grass family. Species of the genus are found in Africa and Eurasia. These grasses are sometimes called nit grass.

Species

The following species are recognised in the genus Gastridium:

- Gastridium lainzii (Romero García) Romero Zarco - south-western Spain
- Gastridium phleoides (Nees & Meyen) C.E.Hubb. - Africa, southern Europe, Middle East, Arabian Peninsula
- Gastridium scabrum C.Presl - Mediterranean region
- Gastridium ventricosum (Gouan) Schinz & Thell - Mediterranean and nearby regions from Great Britain to Cape Verde to Caucasus

Formerly included

see Triplachne

- Gastridium littorale - Triplachne nitens
- Gastridium nitens - Triplachne nitens
- Gastridium triaristatum - Triplachne nitens
