= Watchet Harbour Lighthouse =

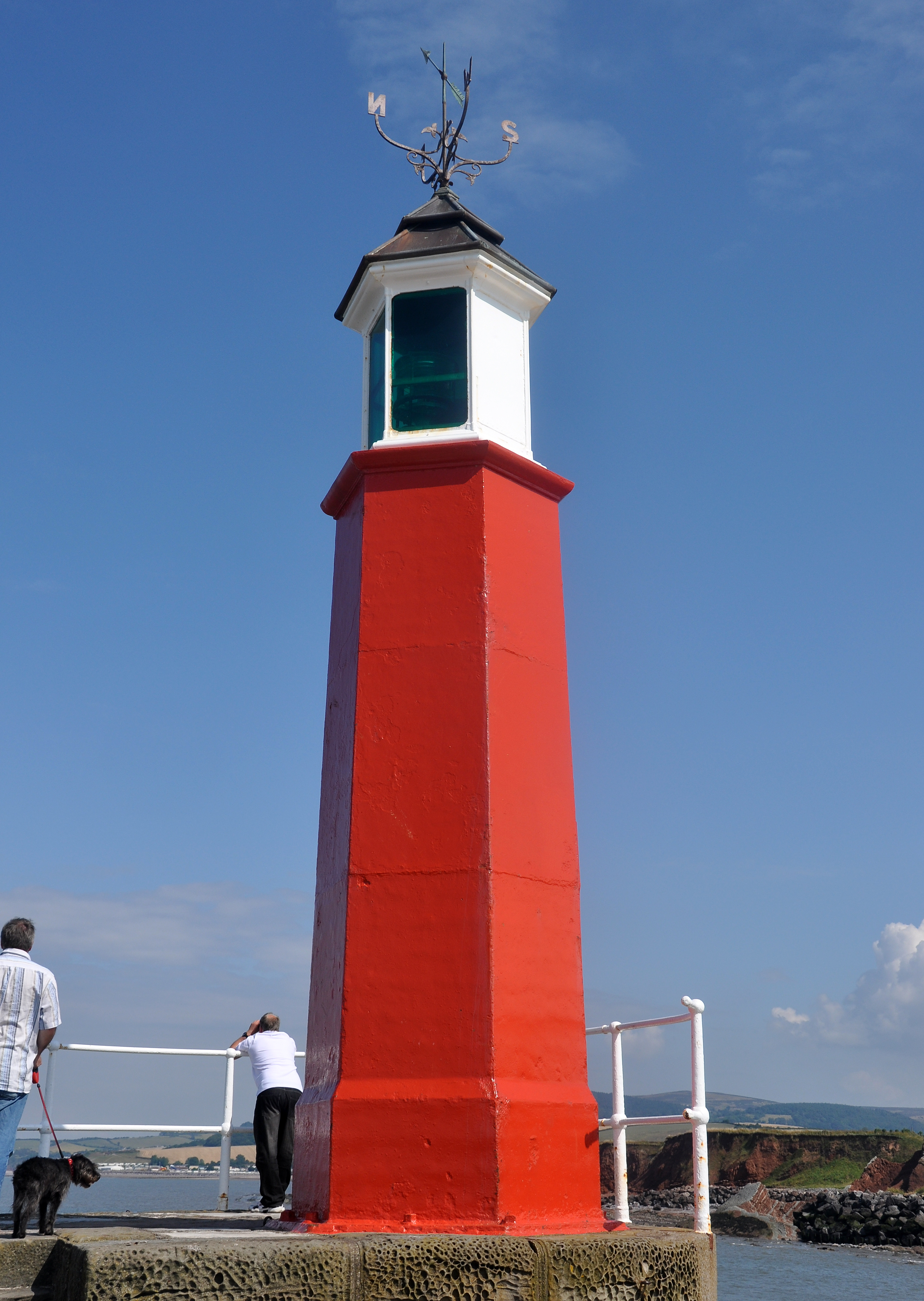
- Watchet Harbour Lighthouse
- Location: Watchet; Somerset; England.
- Coordinates: 51.184016°N 3.328669°W

Tower
- Constructed: 1862
- Construction: cast iron tower
- Height: 6.5 metres (21 ft)
- Shape: tapered hexagonal prism with lantern
- Markings: orange tower, white lantern, dark green lantern roof
- Operator: Watchet Harbour Marina

Light
- Focal height: 9 metres (30 ft)
- Range: 10 miles (16 km)
- Characteristic: F G

The Watchet Harbour Lighthouse is a marine navigational aid marking the entrance to a Marina within the town of Watchet, in Somerset, England.

== History ==
In the 1850s the West Somerset Mineral Railway was nearing completion. Parts of the harbour had fallen into disrepair, and boats were beached and loaded direct from carts brought onto the foreshore. It was recognised that improvements were needed for the sake of the prosperity of the town and the export of iron ore from ironstone mines in the Brendon Hills to Newport and thence to Ebbw Vale for smelting.

The Watchet Harbour Act 1857 (20 & 21 Vict. c. cxli) placed the harbour under the control of commissioners; they built a new east pier and rebuilt the west pier; the work was finished in 1862, and 500 ton vessels could enter the harbour. The west pier on which the lighthouse stands was constructed in 1860, at the same time as the current east pier, by Hennets of Bridgwater, and rebuilt in 1905.

Tenders for the new lighthouse at the end of the harbour wall were placed in 1860. Three bids were received. The design by Isambard Kingdom Brunel was rejected in favour of one by James Abernethy. This was built by Hennet, Spinks and Else of Bridgwater for £75. The cast iron structure was topped with an oil lamp.

In September 2012, Princess Anne unveiled a plaque to commemorate the 150th anniversary of the lighthouse.

== Structure and operation ==
The cast iron lighthouse is approximately 22 feet (6.7 m) in height and has a red hexagonal tower with white lantern, and green lens.

The lighthouse is a harbour navigation mark and does not emit a flashing light associated with traditional lighthouses. Instead it displays a fixed green luminaire marking the starboard (right hand side) approach to the marina.

== See also ==
- List of lighthouses in England
