= Wansbrough Paper Mill =

Paper mill in Somerset, England

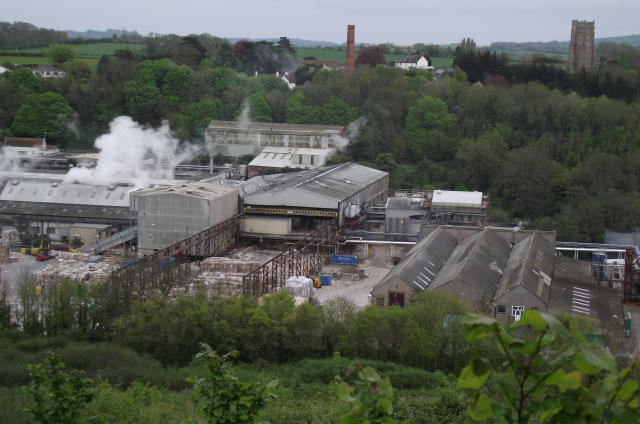
- Wansbrough Paper Mill
- Built: Developed from 1587; Paper mill from 1652
- Location: Watchet, Somerset, England
- Coordinates: 51.180121°N 3.336321°W
- Industry: Paper mill
- Products: Coreboard (UK's largest manufacturer) testliner recycled envelope, bag and kraft papers. plasterboard liner
- Employees: 174
- Defunct: December 2015

Wansbrough Paper Mill was a paper mill located in the town of Watchet, Somerset, when it was the UK's largest manufacturer of coreboard.

== History ==
Watchet, then a relatively isolated farming community with a major port on the Bristol Channel since Roman times, had a population with a need for income over the winter months. With access to ample supplies of wood in the Quantock Hills, the earliest records of paper making in the community date back to 1652.

In the 15th century, a flour mill had been established in the town near the mouth of the Washford River, by the Fulford and Hadley families. Taken over by Sir John Wyndham in 1616, he was keen to develop further milling facilities on his lands in the town. By 1587 the Wyndham estate had established a fulling and grist mill to the south west, on a farm called Snailholt (the site of today's paper mill factory), which was leased to Silvester Bickham. By 1652, the mill had started to produce some paper, which had been sold to John Saffyn of Cullompton, Devon.

By 1727 the tenant of the mill was John Wood, the first of four generations of that family to work the mill until 1834. His son William Wood developed the first paper mill factory on the site from the 1750s. Converting an old apple-fruit press originally used for making cider, paper was initially produced by hand using the locally developed St Decumans process which utilised a vat, to produce one cart of paper product per week.

In 1846 business partners James Date, William Peach and John Wansbrough bought the business from Wood's estate, and introduced mechanised-production via a water wheel powered pulley system. But from the 1860s, the factory started the process of converting to steam power. As the installed Lancashire boilers had initial draughting problems being located in a shelter valley, in 1865 a square-shaped chimney was built of local red bricks from Wellington Brickworks. Its four-sections were each marked by a double-course of buff brick from Ebbw Vale, and further bound by iron-bands. Originally 75 feet (23 m) in height, two further sections were added totalling 15 feet (4.6 m) to provide additional up-draught. The chimney survived until 2011, when it was replaced by a new stainless-steel structure and demolished.

Having started producing paper bags from 1866, by 1869 Wansbrough's son A.C. Wansbrough was the sole owner. In the same year he introduced the factories first papermaking machine, and by 1871, 26 men, 23 women and 10 boys were employed at the mill. A devout Methodist, Wansbrough built a chapel within the factory grounds and insisted that his employee's worship there at least weekly. By this time the factory employed 120, with a workforce mainly made up of widows, who: took less pay; didn't join unions and hence didn't strike; and reduced the poor relief on parish rates. Most of the mill was destroyed by fire in 1889, but less than ten years later five paper machines were operating, and the mill had become the largest manufacturer of paper bags in the UK. In 1896, the business became a limited liability company as the Wansbrough Paper Company Ltd., hence its modern name.

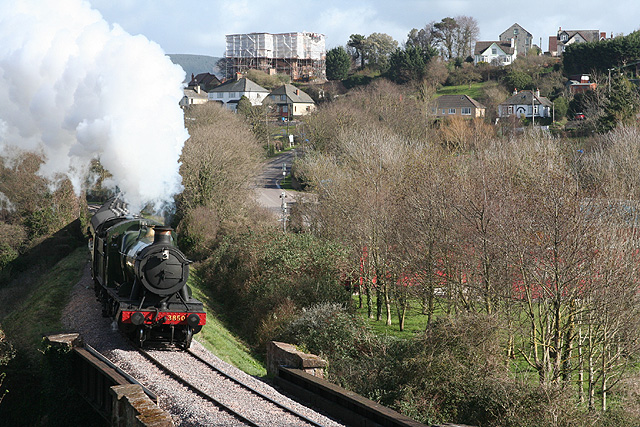
Ex-GWR 2-8-0 No.3850 heading a passenger train towards Minehead on the preserved West Somerset Railway, passes over a viaduct over both the Wansbrough Paper Mill (behind trees), and the old mineral railway from the Brendon iron ore mines to Watchet harbour. Railway access to the mills private sidings was on the far side of the viaduct. March 2007

On 31 March 1862, the West Somerset Railway was opened from Norton Fitzwarren to its terminus at Watchet. But it was not until 16 July 1874 that the Minehead Railway Company in extending the line also connected the mill to the railway. Both lines were operated by the Bristol and Exeter Railway, which became part of the Great Western Railway (GWR) in 1876. The Minehead Railway was taken over by the Great Western in 1897, but the West Somerset Railway remained an independent company until 1922 when it too was absorbed by the Great Western.

The company was bought by W.H. Reed in 1901 to avoid bankruptcy, at which time it employed 350 people. In 1910 the factory purchased its own Clyde puffer steamboat SS Rushlight, which transported coal from the South Wales Coalfield to power the company's static steam engines, and on the return journey distributed paper products. The port also allowed for importation of additional supplies of wood fibre, plus esparto grass from Spain and rags from France for pulping, as well as international product distribution. A second ship, also a Clyde Puffer named SS Arran Monarch was added in 1953.

Staying within the ownership of the Reed family from 1901, from 1974 it was part of the family-controlled public company Reed Smith Holdings. In 1977, employing 500 people, the company and mill were bought by the St Regis Paper Company of New York City. In 1979, the work force of 280 was producing 1,500 tonnes of product a week form mainly recycled pulp, including brown paper for use by the cardboard box industry, plus glazed and wet strength papers for bags, envelopes, wallpapers, and wrappings.

== DS Smith and closure ==
After St Regis merged with Champion International Paper in 1983, in 1986 DS Smith plc, now the UK's largest producer of paper from recycled materials, acquired the UK and European assets of the St Regis Paper Company for £83million.

With an annual capacity of 180,000 tonnes of product and employing 174 people, the mill was the UK's largest manufacturer of coreboard, whilst also producing testliner, recycled envelope, bag and kraft papers. The mill also backed up its sister-plant Kemsley Paper Mill in plasterboard liner production.

In August 2015 it was announced that the mill would close by the end of the year. No definitive reason was given as orders still remained on the companies books. The DS Smith group took a £30M write down to its books on closing the mill.

On June 2nd 2026, at 18:45, the mill buildings were destroyed in an arson attack, where the buildings were set alight. Within an hour after the fire starting, the roof collapsed.
