= Market House Museum =

Local museum in Watchet, Somerset

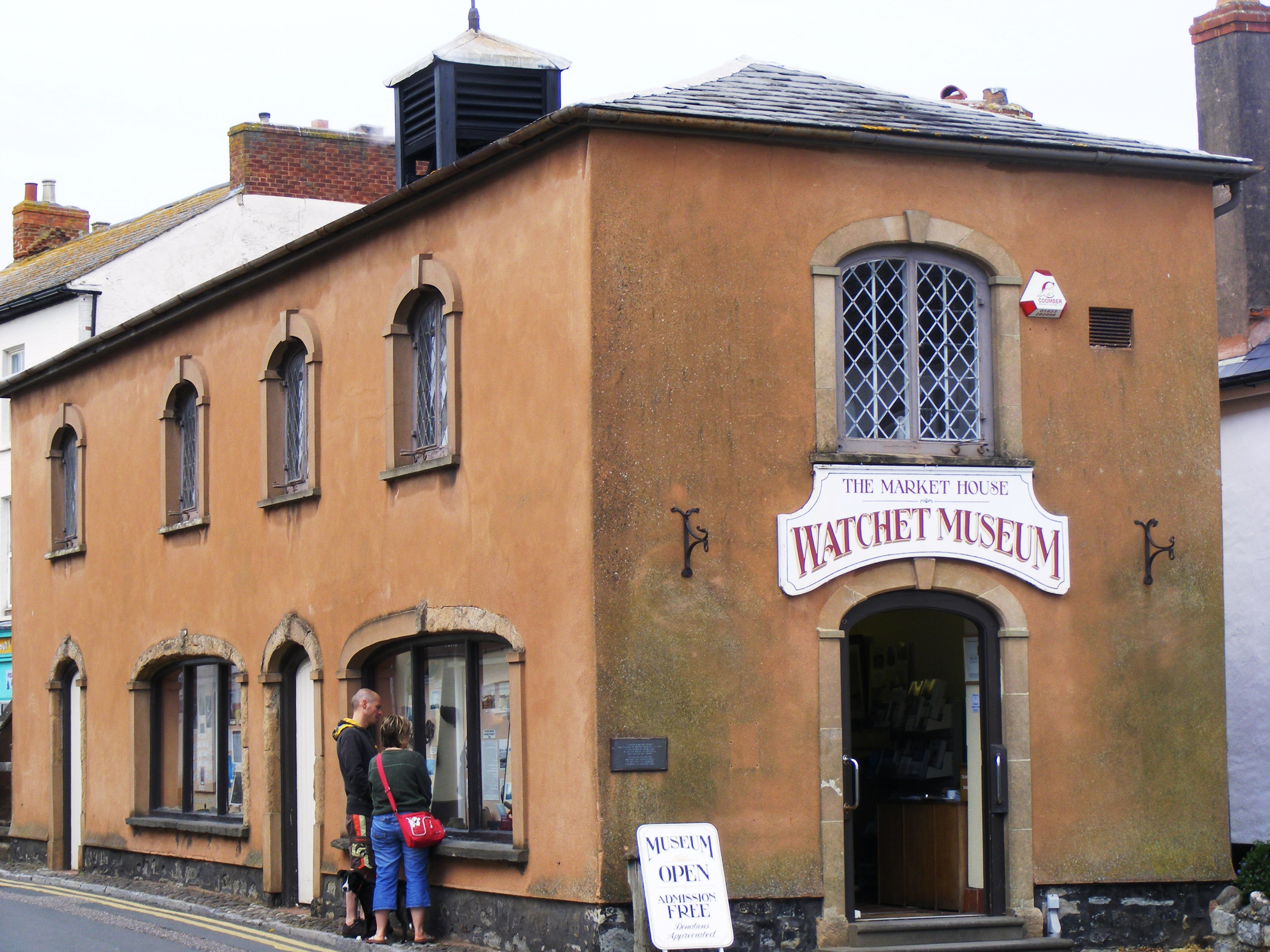

- Location within Somerset and the United Kingdom
- Established: 1979
- Location: Watchet, Somerset
- Coordinates: 51.182627°N 3.330625°W
- Parking: Two municipal nearby
- Website: The Watchet Market House Museum

The Market House Museum is a small museum in Watchet, Somerset, England.

The building on Market Street was constructed in 1820 on the site of the previous market house which had been demolished in 1805. It was converted into a museum in 1979. It is a Grade II listed building.

It houses a collection of exhibits about the natural history of Watchet and the surrounding area. The focus is on nautical and maritime history of the port.

Artefacts include those relating to: Archaeology, Coins and Medals, Land Transport, Maritime, Natural Sciences, Science and Technology and Social History.

At the rear of the museum building is the old town lock up.
