= Watchet =

Town in Somerset, England

Coordinates: 51.1795°N 3.3242°W

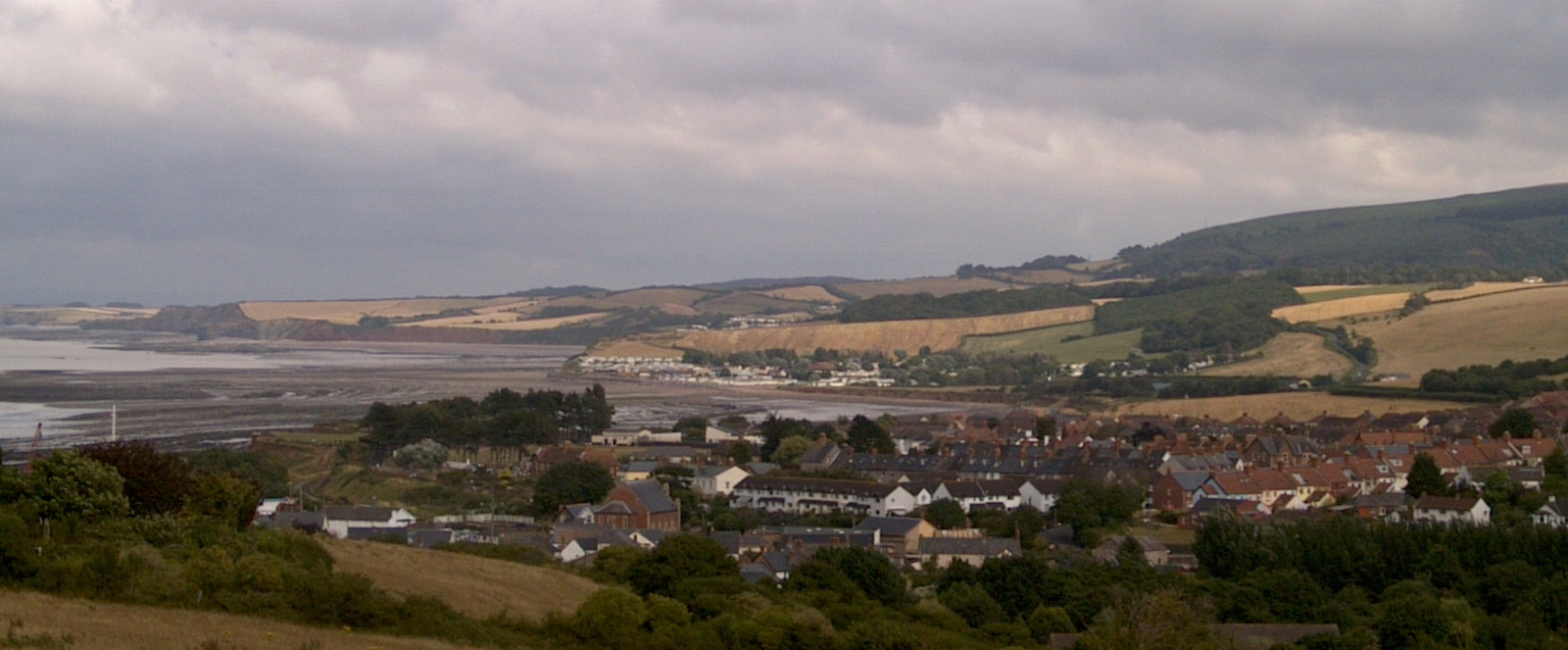
- View overlooking Watchet

- Location within Somerset
- Population: 3,948 (Parish, 2021)
- OS grid reference: ST074431
- Civil parish: Watchet
- Unitary authority: Somerset Council
- Ceremonial county: Somerset
- Region: South West
- Country: England
- Sovereign state: United Kingdom
- Post town: WATCHET
- Postcode district: TA23
- Dialling code: 01984
- Police: Avon and Somerset
- Fire: Devon and Somerset
- Ambulance: South Western
- UK Parliament: Tiverton and Minehead

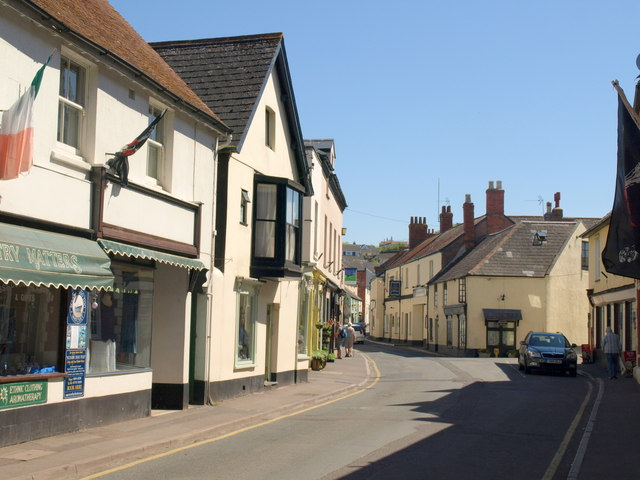
View along Swain Street, Watchet

Watchet is a harbour town and civil parish in Somerset, England. It is situated 15 miles (24 km) west of Bridgwater, 15 miles (24 km) north-west of Taunton, and 9 miles (14 km) east of Minehead. The town lies at the mouth of the Washford River on Bridgwater Bay, part of the Bristol Channel, and on the edge of Exmoor National Park. At the 2021 census, the parish had a population of 3,948.

The original settlement may have been at the Iron Age fort, Daw's Castle. It then moved to the mouth of the river and a small harbour developed. After the Saxon conquest of the area the town developed, becoming known as Weced or Waeced, and was attacked by Vikings in the 10th century. Trade using the harbour gradually grew, despite damage during several severe storms, with import and exports of goods including those from Wansbrough Paper Mill until the 19th century when it increased with the export of iron ore, brought from the Brendon Hills via the West Somerset Mineral Railway, mainly to Newport for onward transportation to the Ebbw Vale Steelworks.

The West Somerset Railway also served the town and port bringing goods and people from the Bristol and Exeter Railway. The iron ore trade reduced, finally ceasing in the early 20th century. The port continued a smaller commercial trade until 2000 when it was converted into a marina. In 2016, Watchet joined the rest of West Somerset in receiving 'Opportunity Area' status.

The church is dedicated to Saint Decuman who is thought to have died here around 706. An early church was built near Daw's Castle and a new church was erected in the 15th century. It has several tombs and monuments to Sir John Wyndham and his family who were the lords of the manor. Samuel Taylor Coleridge's poem The Rime of the Ancient Mariner, which was written in the area, is commemorated by a statue on the harbourside.

East Quay Watchet is a purpose-built art gallery and arts centre that opened in 2021.

== Etymology ==
The name of Watchet is attested in a number of charters and in the Anglo-Saxon Chronicle during the tenth century, in the Old English forms weced, wæced, and wæcet. It appears in the Domesday Book of 1086 as Wacet. Twenty-first-century authorities mostly agree that the name comes from the Common Brittonic words that survive in modern Welsh as gwo- ("under-") and coed ("woodland"). Thus the name once meant "under the wood".

== History ==
Daw's Castle (Dart's Castle or Dane's Castle) is an Iron Age sea cliff hill fort about 0.5 miles (0.80 km) to the west of the town. It was built and fortified, on the site of an earlier settlement, as a burh by Alfred the Great, as part of his defences against Viking raids from the Bristol Channel around 878 AD. It is situated on an east–west cliff about 80 metres (260 ft) above the sea, on a tapering spur of land bounded by the Washford River to the south. Its ramparts would have formed a semicircle backing on to the sheer cliffs, but only about 300 metres (980 ft) are visible today. A Saxon mint was established here in 1035, probably within the fort. It is a scheduled monument.

There is no sign of Roman occupation, but the Anglo-Saxons took Watchet from the native Britons around AD 680. Under Alfred the Great (AD 871−901) Watchet became an important port, and coins minted here have been found as far away as Copenhagen and Stockholm. The Anglo-Saxon Chronicle records the early port being plundered by Danes led by Earl Ottir and a 'Hroald' (possibly Ottir's king Ragnall) in 987 and 997.

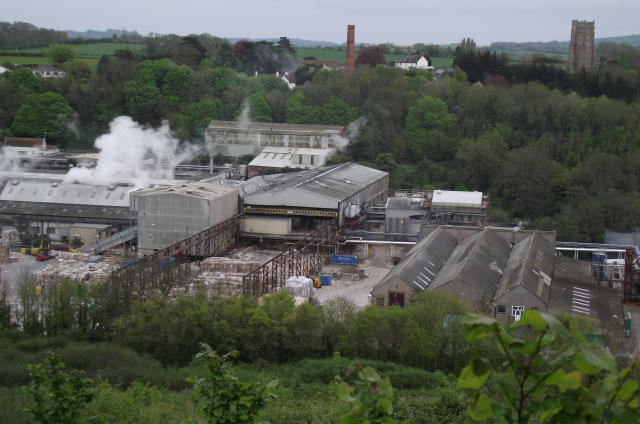
Wansbrough Paper Mill

Watchet is believed to be the place where Saint Decuman was killed around 706 and its parish church is dedicated to him. At the time of the Domesday Book Watchet was part of the estate held by William de Moyon.

In the 15th century, a flour mill was established by the Fulford and Hadley families near the mouth of the Washford River. By 1587 the Wyndham estate had established a fulling and grist mill to the south west. With access to wood from the Quantock Hills, records show that paper making was established by 1652, when the mill had started to produce paper. In 1846 business partners James Date, William Peach and John Wansbrough bought the business and introduced mechanised-production using a water wheel-powered pulley system.

In the 1860s, the factory was converted to steam power and the local harbour was used to import raw materials and export finished goods. Most of the mill was destroyed by fire in 1889, but it was rebuilt, and less than ten years later five paper-making machines were operating. The mill became the largest manufacturer of paper bags in the UK. In 1896, the business became the Wansbrough Paper Company, a limited liability company, and the building became known as the Wansbrough Paper Mill. With an annual capacity of 180,000 tonnes of product and employing 100 people, it was the UK's largest manufacturer of coreboard, and also produced containerboard, recycled envelope, bag and kraft papers. In December 2015 the paper mill ceased production and closed. The mill buildings were destroyed by fire in an arson attack on June 2nd 2026.

=== Harbour ===
Watchet Harbour Act 1707
- Act of Parliament
- Parliament of Great Britain
- Long title: An Act for repairing the Harbour and Key of Watchett, in the County of Somerset.
- Citation: 6 Ann. c. 69 (Note: This is the citation in The Statutes of the Realm.); 6 Ann. c. 9 Pr. (Note: This is the citation in The Statutes at Large.)
- Territorial extent: Great Britain

Dates
- Royal assent: 11 March 1708
- Commencement: 25 March 1708 (Note: Section 1.)
- Repealed: 2 September 1857
Other legislation
Amended by	Watchet Harbour Act 1720; West Somerset Mineral Railway Act 1855
Repealed by	Watchet Harbour Act 1857
Relates to	Watchet Harbour Act 1860

Status: Repealed

Text of statute as originally enacted

Watchet Harbour Act 1720
- Act of Parliament
- Parliament of Great Britain
- Long title: An Act for continuing the Duties granted by several Acts made in the Sixth and Tenth Years of Her late Majesty's Reign, for repairing the Harbour and Key of Watchett, in the County of Somerset.
- Citation: 7 Geo. 1. St. 1. c. 14
- Territorial extent: Great Britain

Dates
- Royal assent: 7 June 1721
- Commencement: 8 December 1720 (Note: Start of session.)
- Repealed: 2 September 1857
Other legislation
Amends	Watchet Harbour Act 1707; Minehead Harbour Act 1711
Repealed by	Watchet Harbour Act 1857
Relates to	Watchet Harbour Act 1860

Status: Repealed

Text of statute as originally enacted

Watchet Harbour Act 1857 (Note: Section 1.)
- Act of Parliament
- Parliament of the United Kingdom
- Long title: An Act for the Maintenance, Regulation, and Improvement of Watchet Harbour in the County of Somerset; and for other Purposes.
- Citation: 20 & 21 Vict. c. cxli
- Territorial extent: United Kingdom

Dates
- Royal assent: 10 August 1857
- Commencement: 2 September 1857 (Note: Section 2. Third Wednesday following the passing of the act.)
- Repealed: 5 September 1860
Other legislation
Amends	West Somerset Mineral Railway Act 1855
Repeals/revokes	Watchet Harbour Act 1707; Minehead Harbour Act 1711; Watchet Harbour Act 1720
Repealed by	Watchet Harbour Act 1860

Status: Repealed

Text of statute as originally enacted

Watchet Harbour Act 1860 (Note: Section 1.)
- Act of Parliament
- Parliament of the United Kingdom
- Long title: An Act for making better Provision for the Maintenance, Regulation, and Improvement of Watchet Harbour; and for other Purposes.
- Citation: 23 & 24 Vict. c. cli
- Territorial extent: United Kingdom

Dates
- Royal assent: 23 July 1860
- Commencement: 5 September 1860 (Note: Section 2. Second Wednesday following the passing of the act.)
Other legislation
Repeals/revokes	Watchet Harbour Act 1857
Amended by	Pier and Harbour Order Confirmation (No. 4) Act 1902; Watchet Urban District Water Act 1934; Watchet Harbour Revision Order 2000
Relates to	Lands Clauses Consolidation Act 1845; Harbours, Docks, and Piers Clauses Act 1847

Status: Amended

Text of statute as originally enacted

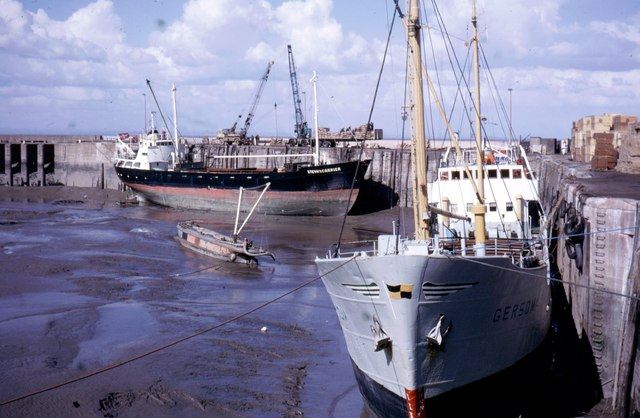
Commercial shipping in the harbour in 1973

Watchet developed as a town thanks to its closeness to the minerals within the Brendon Hills, and its access to the River Severn for onward shipping. Aside from local ships plying trade across the river, from 1564 onwards the port was used for import of salt and wine from France.

In 1643 during the English Civil War, a Royalist ship was sent to Watchet to reinforce for the siege of Dunster Castle. Parliamentarian (Roundhead) Captain Popham ordered his troops into the sea with the tide on the ebb, and with the ship unable to move, attacked the ship with fire from their carbines. Taken by surprise and under heavy attack, the Royalist commander surrendered the ship, resulting in a ship technically at sea being captured by troops on horseback.

The primitive jetty was damaged in a storm of 1659, so that in 1708 leading local wool merchant Sir William Wyndham built a new harbour costing £1,000, with a stronger pier. The main export at this time was kelp, made by burning seaweed for use in glass making. In the 19th century trade increased with the export of iron ore from the Brendon Hills mainly to Newport for onward transportation to the Ebbw Vale Steelworks, paper, flour and gypsum. In 1843 the esplanade was built by George Wyndham, 4th Earl of Egremont, and in 1855 a new harbour was commissioned to cope with increased iron ore trade. The existing harbour was damaged and several vessels wrecked by the Royal Charter Storm on 26 October 1859. A new east pier and wharf was completed in 1861−62 by James Abernethy. This allowed shipping movement to reach a peak, with over 1,100 ship movements per annum. Harbour trade was aided by the coming of the railway, with two independent railways terminating at Watchet from the mid 1860s. The West Somerset Mineral Railway ran down from the iron mines on the Brendon Hills, and the West Somerset Railway came up from the Bristol and Exeter Railway at Norton Fitzwarren. At the peak in the trade during the late 19th century 40,000 tons of ore were exported annually.

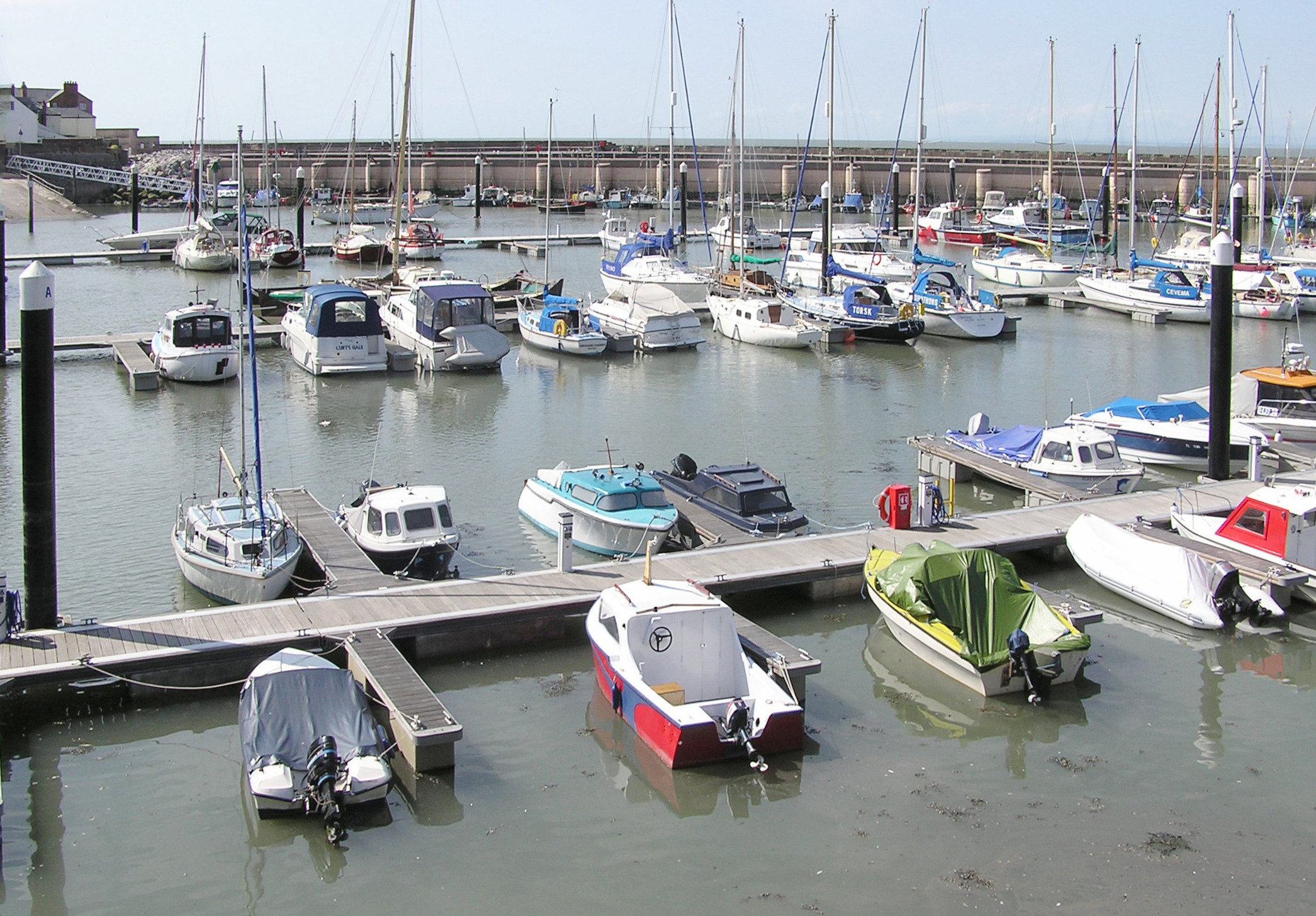
Watchet marina

In 1862, the cast-iron Watchet Harbour Lighthouse was built by Hennet, Spinks and Else of Bridgwater. In September 2012, Princess Anne unveiled a plaque to celebrate the 150th anniversary of the lighthouse. The mines and West Somerset Mineral Railway closed in 1898. The West Somerset Railway, extended from Watchet to Minehead in 1874, survived as part of British Rail until 1971. Reopened as a heritage railway, it still operates today. In 1900 and 1903 a series of gales breached the breakwater and East Pier with the loss of several vessels each time and subsequent repairs.

After the First World War, the Cardiff Scrap and Salvage company Ltd. took a lease on part of the harbour, from 1920 to 1923. In autumn 1923, the company scrapped the second class protected cruiser HMS Fox of the Astraea-class of the Royal Navy, which at 320 feet (98 m) is still the largest vessel ever to enter the harbour. Before the Second World War, a gunnery range was established for various army units to practice anti-aircraft gunnery at a site between Watchet and Doniford. Unmanned target aircraft were towed by planes from RAF Weston Zoyland, and later were fired from catapults over the sea. Little of the camp buildings survives, and it is now the site of a holiday park.

The port remained open to service the papermills, importing wood pulp and esparto grass from Russia and Scandinavia, using mainly East European registered vessels after the Second World War. Requiring a return load, the result was that Watchet became a leading UK port for the export of car parts, tractors and other industrial goods. However, with the replacement of coal with oil from the mid-1960s, the port traffic began to terminally decline. The harbour was in commercial use until 2000, it has now been converted into a marina for pleasure boats. It is surrounded by renovated quaysides and narrow streets. The commercial esplanade has been refurbished with new shelters, information points, and the provision of new paving in some areas, as well as railings, lamps, curved benches, planters and new tree plantings.

There are several museums in the town, including the Market House Museum, which explores the history of the town and its harbour. The building was constructed in 1820 on the site of the previous market house which had been demolished in 1805. It was converted into a museum in 1979. It houses a collection of exhibits about the natural history of Watchet and the surrounding area. The focus is on nautical and maritime history of the port. Artefacts include those relating to: Archaeology, Coins and Medals, Land Transport, Maritime, Natural Sciences, Science and Technology and Social History. At the rear of the museum building is the old town lock-up for the temporary detention of people, often drunks who were usually released the next day or to hold people being brought before the local magistrate. The Watchet Boat Museum, which is housed in the 1862 Victorian architecture former railway goods shed, displays the unusual local flatner boats and associated artefacts.

=== Lifeboat ===
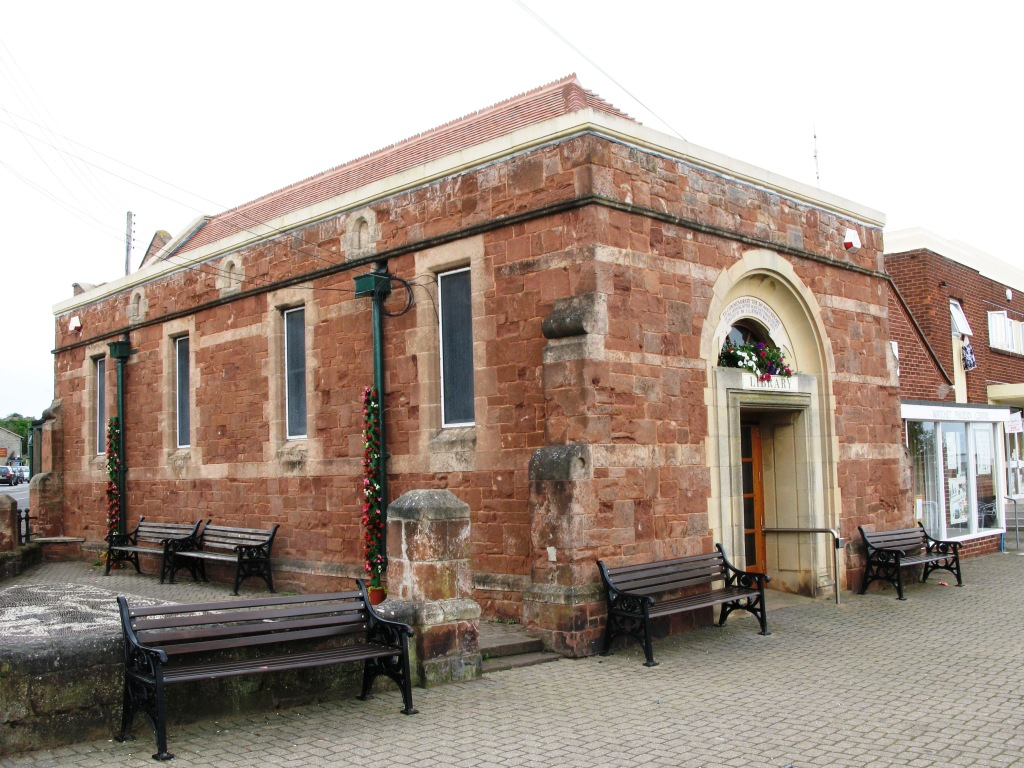
The former lifeboat station which is now the library

The Royal National Lifeboat Institution stationed a lifeboat at Watchet in 1875. The station was closed in 1944 by which time the nearby station at Minehead had been equipped with a motor lifeboat that could cover the area around Watchet. The boat was launched from the slipway at the western corner of the harbour, but the boat house was at the southern corner near the railway station and the boat was taken along the quay on a carriage.

The building was gifted to the town in 1951 and opened as a library in May 1953. In 2019 the ownership was transferred from the county council to Watchet town council.

== Governance ==
There are two tiers of local government covering Watchet, at parish (town) and unitary authority level: Watchet Town Council and Somerset Council. The town council is based at the Watchet Visitor Centre on Harbour Road.

For national elections, the town forms part of the Tiverton and Minehead constituency.

=== Administrative history ===
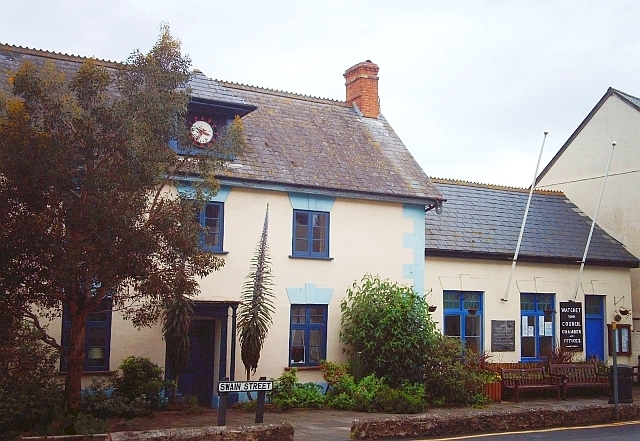
Former council offices, 5 Swain Street

Watchet historically formed part of the ancient parish of St Decuman's in the Williton and Freemanners hundred of Somerset. The parish was named after its parish church, to the south of Watchet, and also included Williton and surrounding rural areas. When elected parish and district councils were established in 1894, St Decuman's was given a parish council and included in the Williton Rural District. The parish was split in 1902 into two civil parishes called Williton and Watchet, with Watchet also being made its own urban district at the same time. Watchet Urban District Council based itself in a converted 18th-century house at 5 Swain Street.

Watchet Urban District was abolished in 1974 under the Local Government Act 1972, with its area becoming part of the new West Somerset district. A successor parish was created covering the former urban district, with its parish council taking the name Watchet Town Council.

West Somerset was abolished in 2019, becoming part of the short-lived district of Somerset West and Taunton, which was in turn abolished four years later in 2023. Somerset County Council then took over district-level functions across its area, making it a unitary authority, and was renamed Somerset Council.

== Geography ==
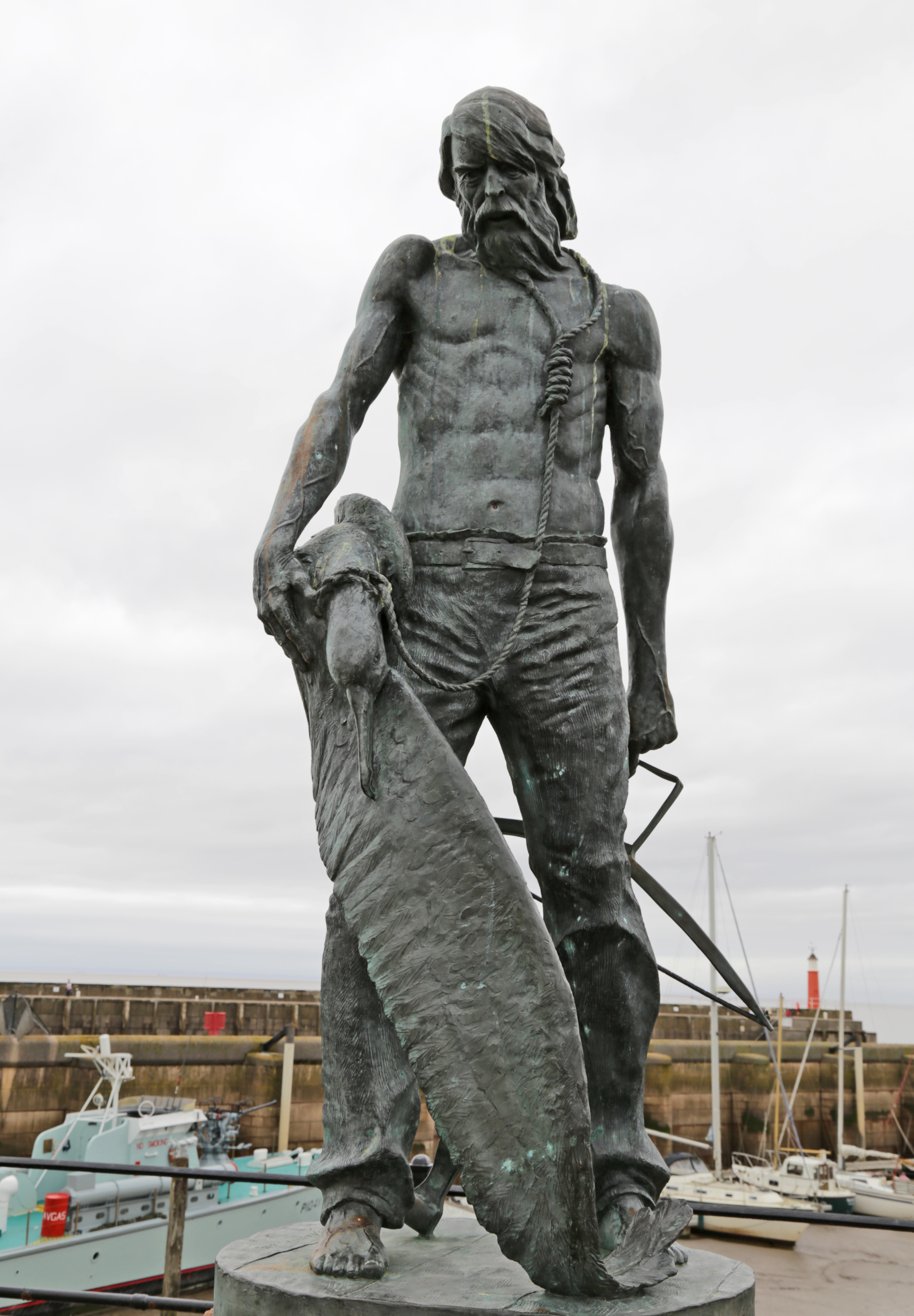
A statue of the Ancient Mariner at Watchet Harbour, unveiled in September 2003 as a tribute to Samuel Taylor Coleridge

The foreshore at Watchet is rocky, with a high 6 metres (20 ft) tidal range. The cliffs between Watchet and Blue Anchor show a distinct pale, greenish blue colour, resulting from the coloured alabaster found there. The name "Watchet" or "Watchet Blue" was used in the 16th century to denote this colour. A fragment of a lower jaw from a Phytosaur longirostrine archosaur has been described from early Hettangian strata.

Kentsford Bridge is a packhorse bridge over the Washford River. It existed before the English Reformation, possibly being a route to Cleeve Abbey and was repaired in 1613. The bridge is 54 inches (1,400 mm) wide and has a total span of 16 feet (4.9 m).

== Culture ==
Samuel Taylor Coleridge's poem The Rime of the Ancient Mariner was written in 1797 whilst travelling through Watchet and the surrounding area. He lived at Coleridge Cottage in Nether Stowey and while living there he wrote "This Lime-Tree Bower My Prison", part of "Christabel", Frost at Midnight and The Rime of the Ancient Mariner.

It is claimed that the sight of harbour, from St Decuman's Church, was the primary inspiration for Coleridge to start the poem. In September 2003, a commemorative statue, by Alan B Herriot of Penicuik, Scotland, was unveiled at the harbour.

Local traditions include Lantern Night, which is held on 16 September and involves children in the town with candle lanterns made from hollowed out root vegetables such as mangelwurzel or swede. It was the last remaining reminder of the Watchet Fair (also known as St Decuman's Fair). Another tradition is Queen Caturn's Day on the last Saturday of November. Watchet was famous for its blue dye and Queen Caturn was so impressed she bestowed the town's folk with cider and cakes as a reward for this. The tradition is carried on with costumes and celebrations.

== Media ==
Local news and television programmes are BBC West and ITV West Country. Television signals are received from the Mendip TV transmitter.

Local radio stations are BBC Radio Somerset on 95.5 FM, Heart West on 102.6 FM, Greatest Hits Radio South West on 102.4 FM, and West Somerset Radio, community based radio station that broadcast from the town on 104.4 FM.

The town is served by local newspapers, West Somerset Free Press and Somerset County Gazette.

== Transport ==
Adjacent to the harbour is Watchet station. This is now an intermediate stop on the West Somerset Railway, a largely steam-operated heritage railway that links Bishops Lydeard, near Taunton, with Minehead. The station was first opened on 31 March 1862, when the West Somerset Railway was opened from Norton Junction. The station was built as a terminus, for part of the commercial aim of the WSR was to provide a wider and cheaper distribution route for goods from the then major port of Watchet. The line was extended westwards by the Minehead Railway Company on 16 July 1874, with an industrial railway siding provided at the same time into the Wansbrough Paper Mill. The GWR undertook many projects to increase the capacity of the line in the 1930s. Nationalisation in 1948 saw the GWR become the Western Region of British Railways. Freight traffic was withdrawn on 6 July 1964, and passenger trains on 4 January 1971. The station was reopened by the new West Somerset Railway on 28 August 1976.

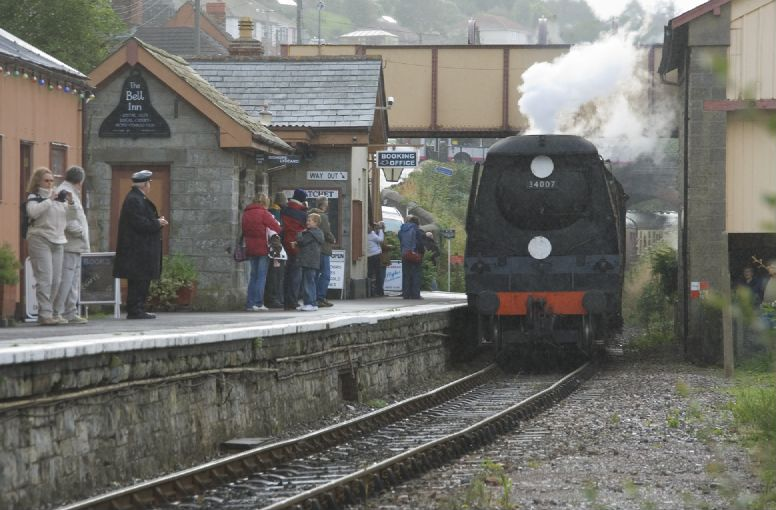
No.34007 Wadebridge, a former-SR West Country class 4-6-2 Pacific, arrives into Watchet railway station from Minehead, heading a passenger train on the heritage West Somerset Railway

The harbour was also linked, with a separate station, to the independent West Somerset Mineral Railway, that ran to iron ore mines in the Brendon Hills south west of the town. From Watchet the ore was carried across the Bristol Channel by ship to Newport and thence to Ebbw Vale for smelting to extract the iron. The line was ready for traffic from Watchet to Roadwater by April 1857, Although the outward terminal of the line was to be the quay at Watchet, the pier had been practically unusable for some considerable time, and boats were beached and loaded direct from carts brought on to the foreshore. After considerable public pressure, the Watchet Harbour Act was passed in 1857, placing it under the control of Commissioners; they built a new east pier and rebuilt the west pier; the work was finished in 1862, and 500 ton vessels could enter the harbour. Passenger services were also provided from Watchet, however these were not financially successful and with the declining output from the Iron ore mines the line closed in 1898. It briefly reopened in the early 20th century.

The trackbed of the old West Somerset Mineral Railway now forms a path, which can be followed from the harbour at Watchet to Washford station, also on the West Somerset Railway.

== Education ==
The Knights Templar Church of England/Methodist Community School in Liddymore Road was built in 1990. It takes its name from the land on which it was built which was owned by the Knights Templar. Middle and an upper schools are available in Williton and Minehead including The West Somerset Community College, which provides education for 1298 students between the ages of 13 and 18.

== Religious sites ==
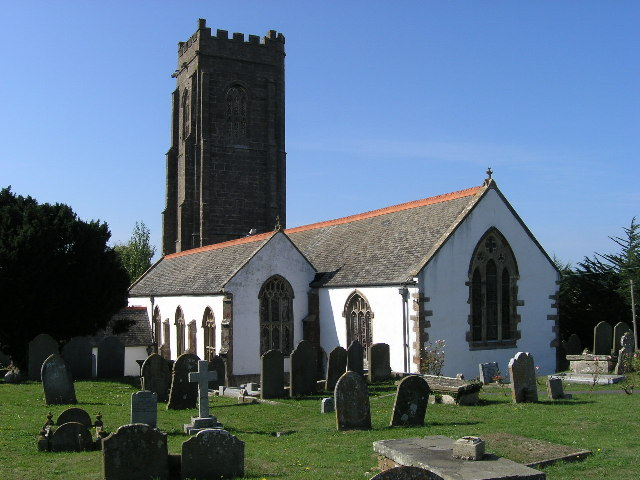
The medieval parish church of Watchet is dedicated to St Decuman

The Anglican St Decuman's Church is probably on an ancient pre-Christian site, on a hill top between Watchet and Williton. An earlier church was situated by the sea at Daw's Castle (probably the original site of Watchet) but was abandoned because of sea erosion. When the church was rebuilt in the 12th century it appears that the bones of St Decuman were moved. The chancel of the present church is unusually wide and may have housed the tomb of St Decuman. The "Translation of Saint Decuman" used to be celebrated. The 15th-century, Grade I listed church is dedicated to him. The Norman church was rebuilt in the 15th and 16th centuries when the central tower was demolished and the present one built at the west end. It was restored and reseated by James Piers St Aubyn between 1886 and 1891, with further internal alterations being made in 1896 when the Caen stone reredos was erected.

The church was described by Francis Carolus Eeles ("St Decuman's Church") in 1932. He highlighted a fine geometrical east window with original tracery dating from the end of the 13th century and the perpendicular window tracery in the south isle. The series of wagon roofs with rich carving are above the rood screen in the nave and south aisle. The Wyndham Chapel occupies the east end of the north aisle and is dedicated to the Wyndham family of nearby Orchard Wyndham House, former lords of the manor. Included is a memorial to Sir John Wyndham (1558–1645), who played an important role in the establishment of defence organisation in the West Country against the threat of the Spanish Armada. Next to his monument is one to his parents, and the chest tomb of his grandparents, with monumental brasses, serves to separate the chapel from the chancel. A mural monument exists with kneeling effigies of two of Sir John's sons, Henry and George, as well as other monuments to the later family of Wyndham. The organ was presented to the church in 1933 by W. Wyndham.

St Decuman's well is below the church. It is a 19th-century reconstruction of the earlier well on the site which dates from the Middle Ages. In addition to the Church of St Decuman there is also a Methodist church in Watchet. It was built as a Wesleyan chapel in 1871. The Baptist church was built in 1824. Cleeve Abbey, one of the best preserved medieval monasteries in England, lies about 2 miles (3.2 km) west of Watchet, in the village of Washford.

== Notable people ==
- Decuman (died c. 706), one of the Celtic saints who came to Somerset from Pembrokeshire, South Wales.
- Allan Pearse (1915–1981), cricketer, played 9 first-class cricket matches for Somerset
- John Gouriet (1935–2010), Army officer, company director and political activist, founded the National Association for Freedom (now known as The Freedom Association), father was local

== Bibliography ==
- Adkins, Lesley; Adkins, Roy (1992). A Field Guide to Somerset Archaeology. Wimborne, Dorset: Dovecote Press. ISBN 978-0946159949.
- Aston, Michael (1982). Ian Burrow (ed.). The Archaeology of Somerset. ISBN 978-0861830282.
- Berryman, David (2006). Somerset airfields in the Second World War. Newbury: Countryside Books. ISBN 1-85306-864-0.
- Body, Geoff; Gallop, Roy (2015). Any Muddy Bottom: A History of Somerset's Waterborne Trade. History Press. ISBN 9780750961639.
- Carter, E. (1959). An Historical Geography of the Railways of the British Isles. Cassell.
- Farr, Grahame (1954). Somerset Harbours. Christopher Johnson.
- Farr, Grahame (1974). Ships and Harbours of Exmoor (2 ed.). Exmoor Press. ISBN 978-0900131158.
- Leete-Hodge, Lornie (1985). Curiosities of Somerset. Bodmin: Bossiney Books. ISBN 978-0-906456-99-6.
- Leonard, Richie; Denton, Tony (2025). Lifeboat Enthusiasts Handbook 2025. Lifeboats Enthusiasts Society.
- Mitchell, Vic; Smith, Keith (1990). Branch Line to Minehead: Preservation Perfection. Middleton Press. ISBN 978-0906520802.
- Norman, W.H. (Ben) (1985). Tales of Watchet Harbour. W.H.(Ben) Norman. ISBN 0-951084208.
- Norman, W.H. (Ben) (1992). Legends and Folklore of Watchet. W.H.(Ben) Norman. ISBN 978-0951084212.
- Oakley, Mike (2006). Somerset Railway Stations. Dovecote Press. ISBN 978-1904349099.
- Thomas, David St John (1966). Regional History of the Railways of Great Britain: The West Country v. 1. David & Charles.
- Waite, Vincent (1964). Portrait of the Quantocks. London: Robert Hale. ISBN 978-0709111580.
