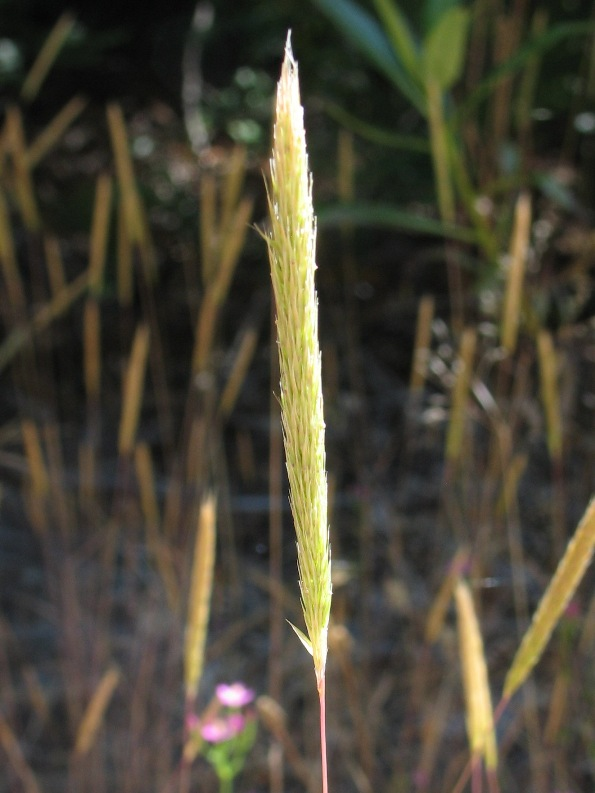

Scientific classification
- Kingdom: Plantae
- Clade: Tracheophytes
- Clade: Angiosperms
- Clade: Monocots
- Clade: Commelinids
- Order: Poales
- Family: Poaceae
- Subfamily: Pooideae
- Genus: Gastridium
- Species: G. ventricosum

Binomial name
- Gastridium ventricosum (Gouan) Schinz & Thell.

Synonyms
- Agrostis ventricosa Gouan; Alopecurus ventricosus (Gouan) Huds.; Milium lendigerum L.; Agrostis australis L.; Agrostis panicea Lam.; Avena lendigera (L.) Salisb.; Agrostis lendigera (L.) Brot.; Gastridium australe (L.) P.Beauv.; Vilfa australis (L.) P.Beauv.; Vilfa panicea (Lam.) P.Beauv.; Gastridium muticum Günther; Milium muticum Spreng.; Gastridium scabrum C.Presl; Gastridium vestitum Spreng.; Calamagrostis schwabii Spreng.; Gastridium siculum Trin.; Arundo schwabii (Spreng.) Schult. & Schult.f.; Milium scabrum (C.Presl) Guss.; Gastridium lendigerum (L.) Gaudin; Agrostis sicula Guss. ex Steud.; Chilochloa ventricosa P.Beauv. ex Steud.; Gastridium laxum Boiss. & Reut.; Milium minimum Pourr. ex Willk. & Lange

= Gastridium ventricosum =

Species of grass

Gastridium ventricosum is a species of grass known by the common name nit-grass (British Isles) or nit grass (USA). This is an annual grass bearing a long, thin, smooth inflorescence of spikelets. It is native to Europe, North Africa, and southwestern Asia but has become naturalized in scattered locations elsewhere.
