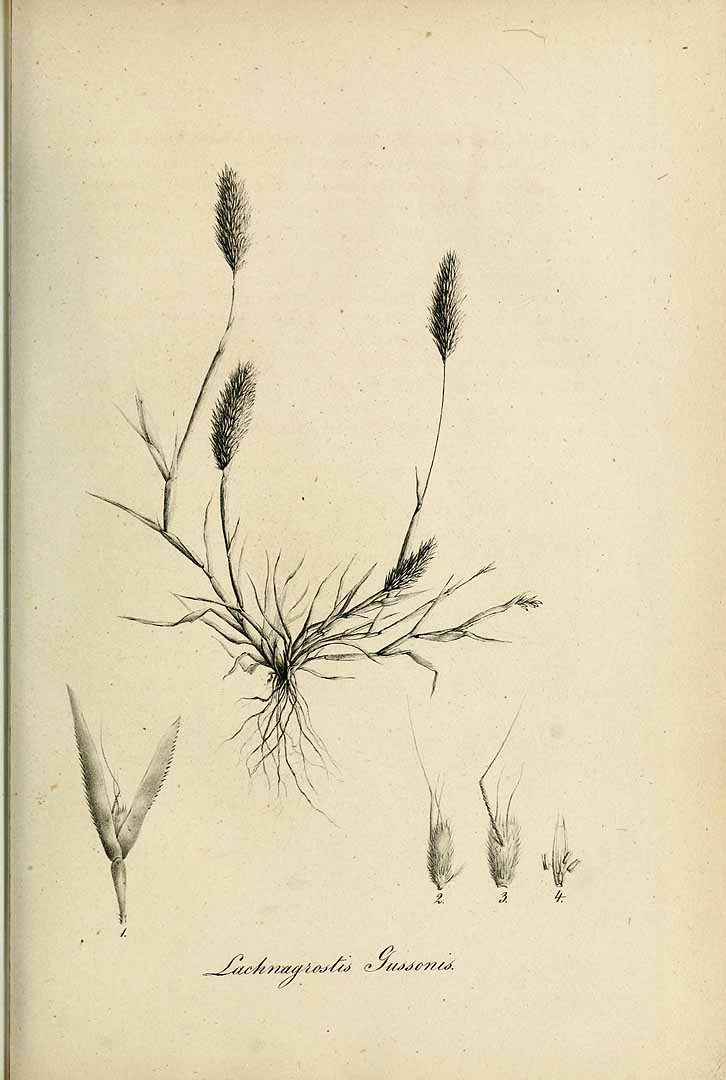

Scientific classification
- Kingdom: Plantae
- Clade: Embryophytes
- Clade: Tracheophytes
- Clade: Spermatophytes
- Clade: Angiosperms
- Clade: Monocots
- Clade: Commelinids
- Order: Poales
- Family: Poaceae
- Subfamily: Pooideae
- Supertribe: Poodae
- Tribe: Poeae
- Subtribe: Agrostidinae
- Genus: Triplachne; Link
- Species: T. nitens

Binomial name
- Triplachne nitens (Guss.) Link

Synonyms
- Agrostis nitens Guss.; Lachnagrostis gussonis Trin.; Gastridium nitens (Guss.) Coss. & Durieu; Gastridium triaristatum Durieu; Gastridium littorale Durieu ex Parl.; Milium lendigerum Delile ex Boiss.

= Triplachne =

Shining grass

Genus of grasses

Triplachne is a genus of seaside plants in the grass family, native to shorelines in the Mediterranean region from the Canary Islands to Turkey. The only known species is Triplachne nitens, called shining grass. It is native to Spain (incl Canary + Balearic Is), Portugal (incl Madeira), Sicily, Greece (incl Crete), Algeria, Morocco, Libya, Tunisia, Egypt (incl Sinai), Turkey, Cyprus, Palestine, Israel.
