= Washford River =

River in Somerset, England

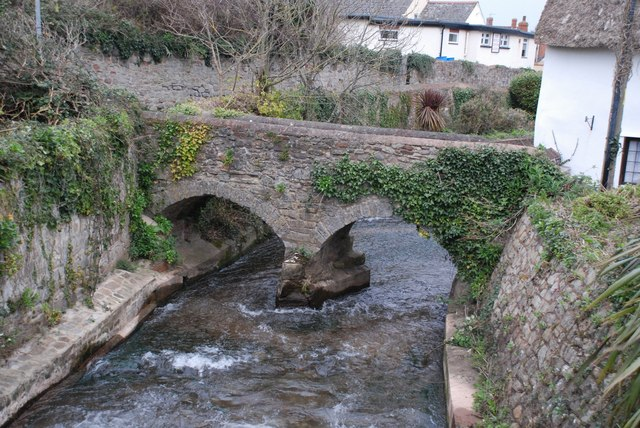
- Footbridge over the Washford River in Watchet

Location
- Country: England within the United Kingdom
- County: Somerset

Physical characteristics
- Source
  - location: Near Treborough
  - coordinates: 51.10943°N 3.41990°W
  - elevation: 1,213 ft (370 m)
- Mouth: Bristol Channel
  - location: Watchet
  - coordinates: 51°11′00″N 3°20′09″W
- Length: 19 kilometres (12 mi)
- Basin size: 33.3 square kilometres (12.9 sq mi)

The Washford River is a river in the English county of Somerset. It rises at 1,213 feet (370 m) above mean sea level near the village of Treborough, in the Brendon Hills, and flows into the Bristol Channel in the port town of Watchet. On its course it flows through the civil parishes of Treborough, Luxborough, Withycombe, Old Cleeve, Nettlecombe, Williton and Watchet, and through the settlements of Pooltown, Kingsbridge, Roadwater, Torre, Washford and Watchet.

The river valley passes through the Cleeve Hill Site of Special Scientific Interest, and close to Cleeve Abbey.

The Washford River has a length of 19 kilometres (12 mi) and drains a catchment area of 33.3 square kilometres (12.9 sq mi). The Environment Agency defines two waterbodies for the catchment area. The Washford - Lower waterbody comprises the area up to Tacker Street, just upstream of Roadwater, whilst the Washford - Upper waterbody comprises the area above that point. As of August 2023, the Washford - Lower waterbody had a moderate ecological status, whilst the Washford - Upper had a poor ecological status.

== Gallery ==
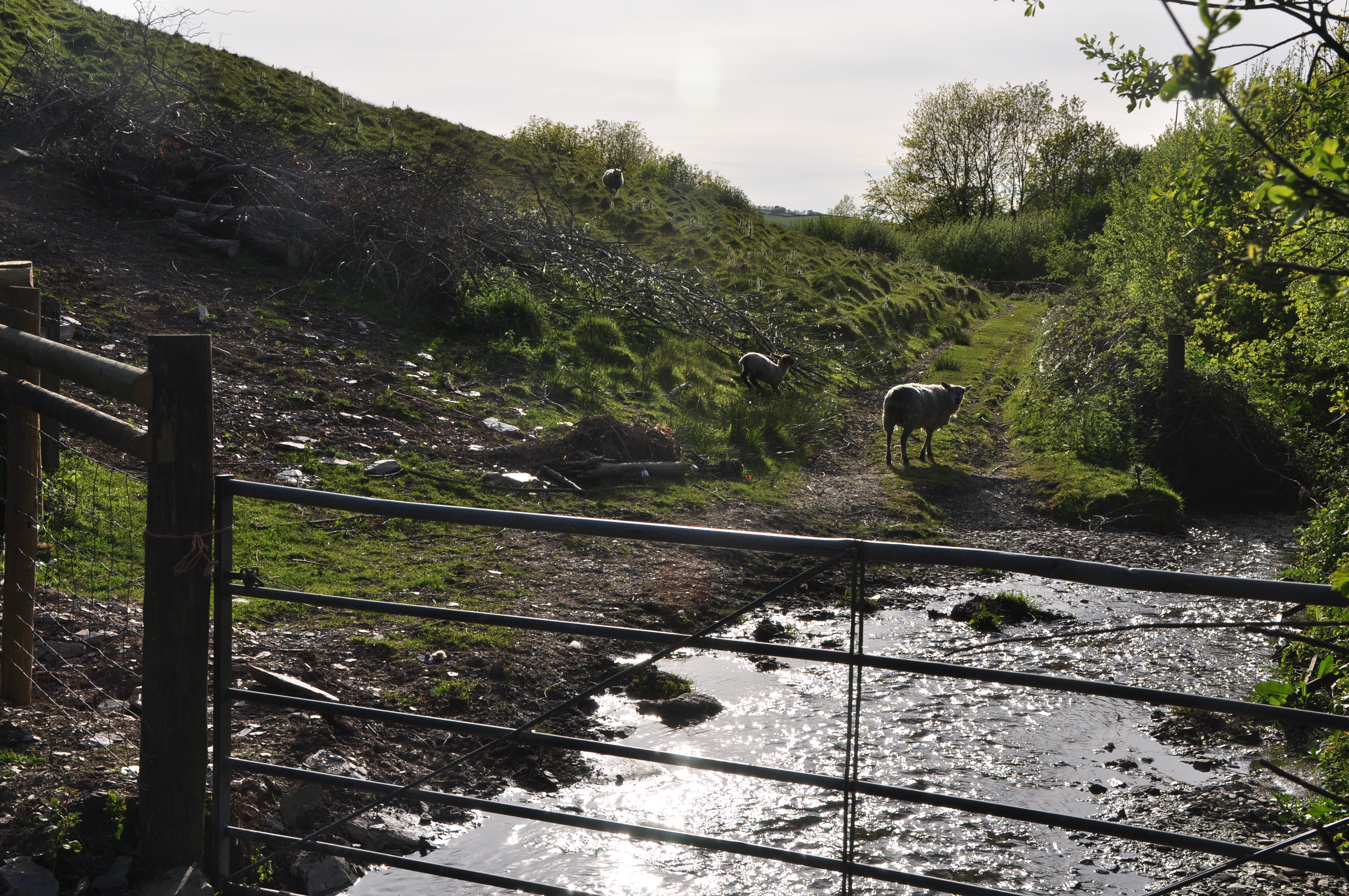
Headwaters in Treborough

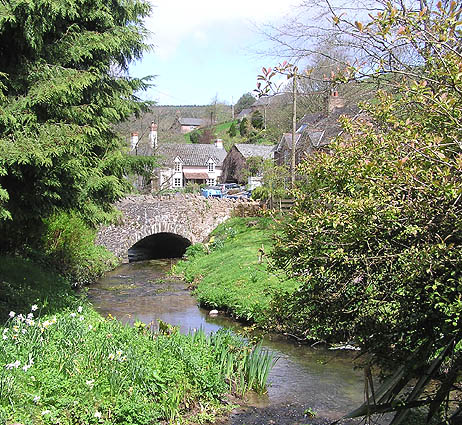
The river in Pooltown

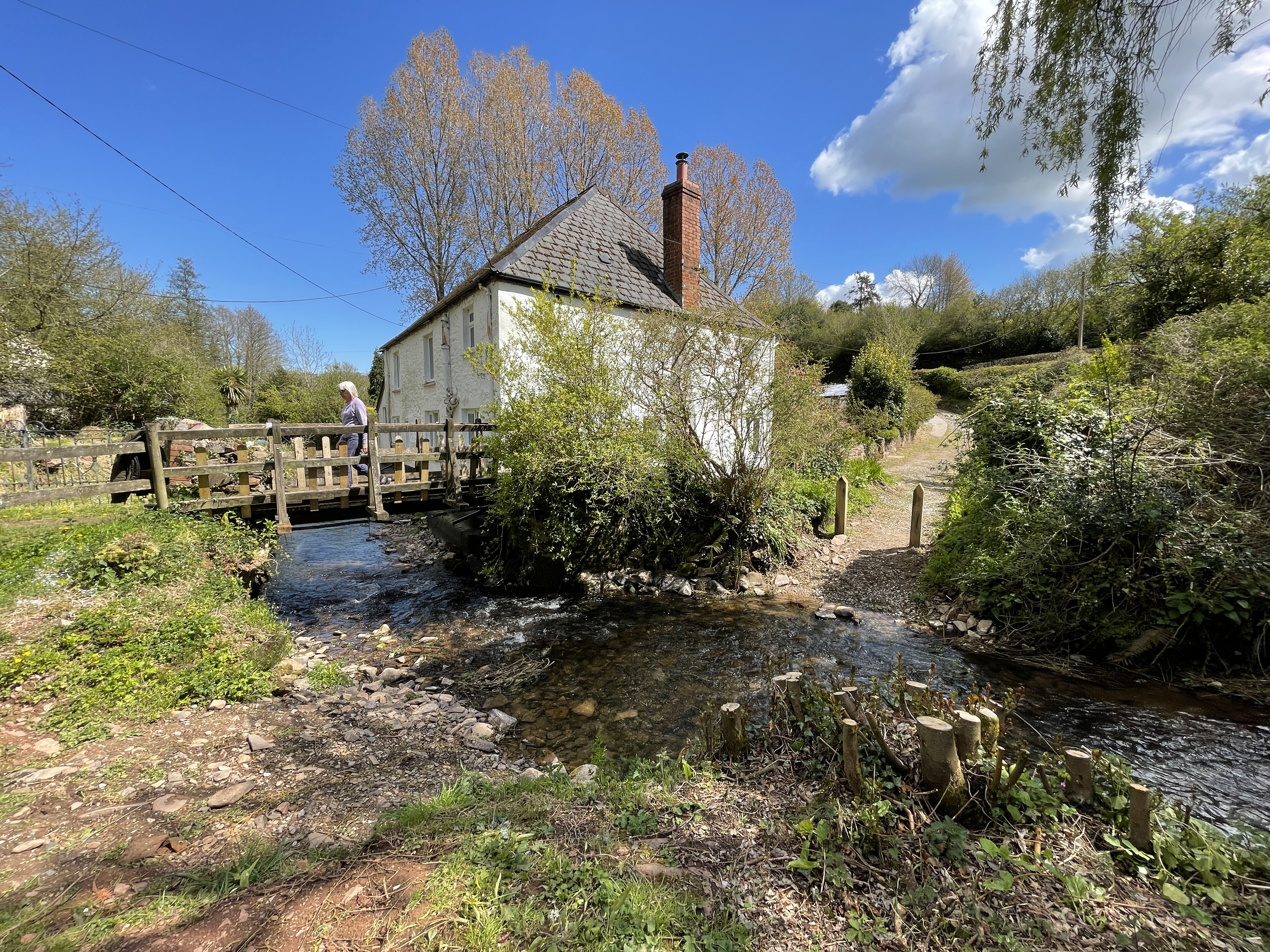
Ford at Tacker Street

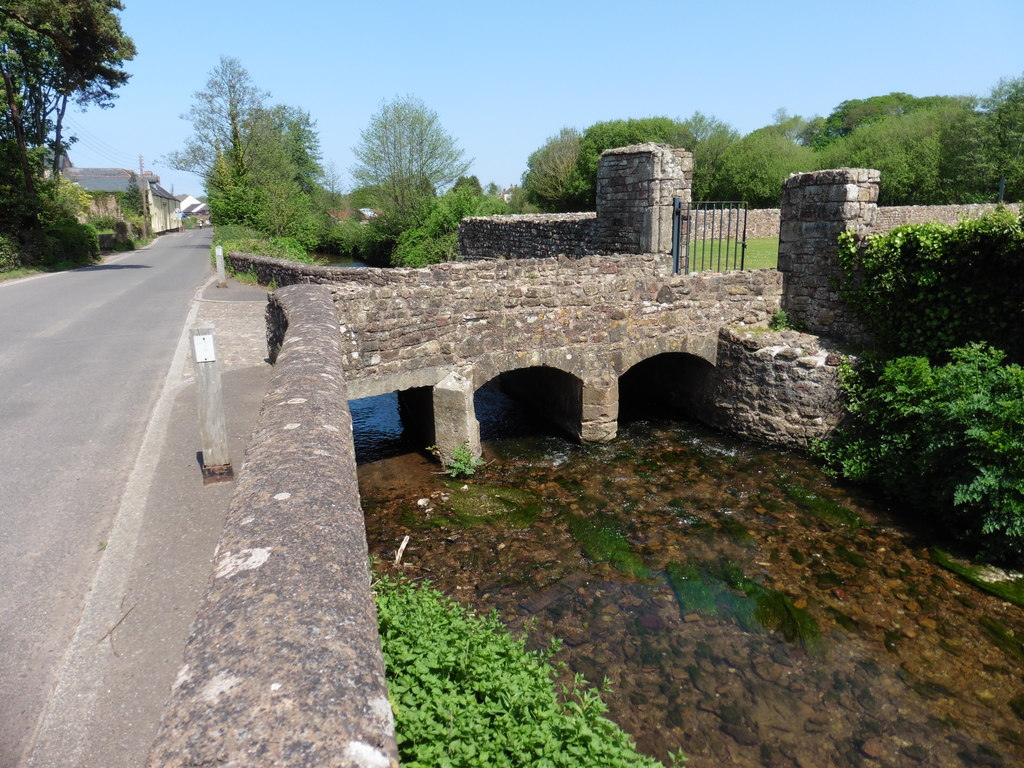
The river by Cleeve Abbey

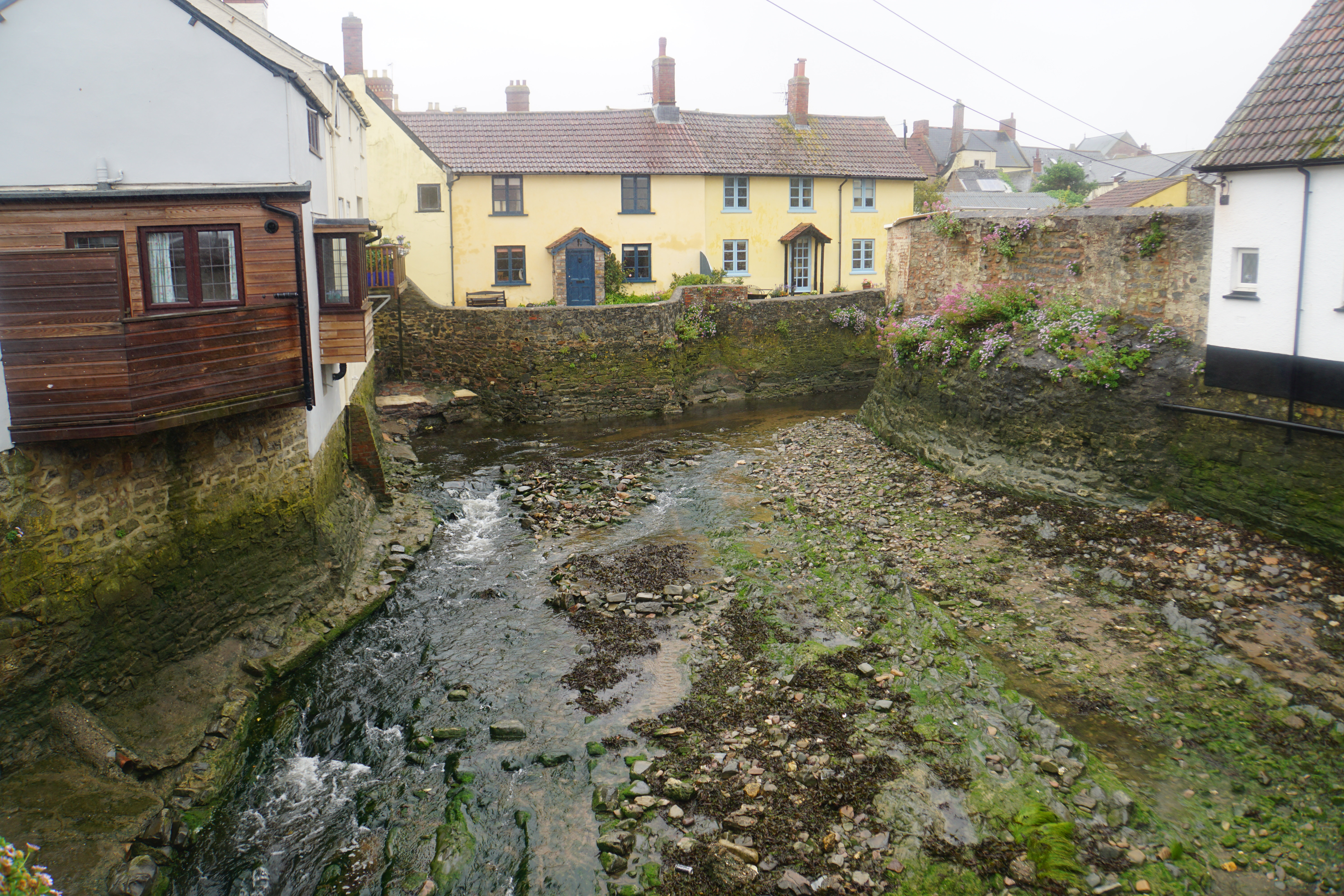
The tidal basin in Watchet
