= Davidstow Creamery =

- Leti Logdewi
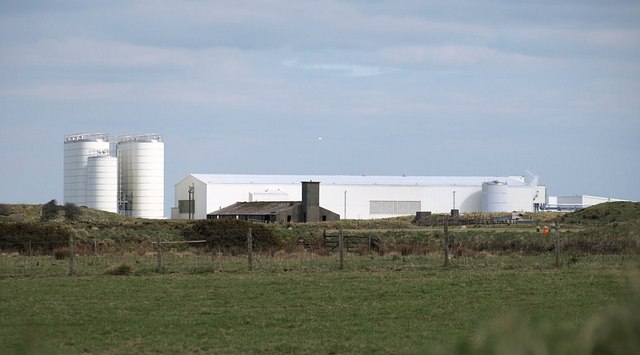
- Seen in March 2008

- Location within Cornwall
- Former names: Dairy Crest Davidstow

General information
- Type: Cheese factory
- Architectural style: Factory
- Location: Davidstow, Cornwall, PL32 9XW
- Coordinates: 50.65°N 4.633°W
- Elevation: 300 m (984 ft)
- Current tenants: 200 staff
- Construction started: 1950
- Completed: 2005
- Cost: £55M (2005)
- Owner: Saputo Dairy UK

The Davidstow Creamery (Cornish: Leti Logdewi) is a manufacturing plant in Cornwall, England. It is the largest cheese factory in the UK, and the largest mature cheddar plant in the world. It is the main manufacturing facility for the Cathedral City cheddar cheese brand. 50% of all milk produced in Cornwall goes to the site.

== History ==
The site is on a windswept hill top, and began in 1950. The site was started by Dried Milk Products Ltd, in Camelford Rural District. Cheese manufacture would begin in 1951. Another site was at Newcastle Emlyn, in West Wales, which closed in 1983, and a plant at Lostwithiel in south Cornwall, which later included a clotted cream plant, when production was transferred from St Blazey in the late 1960s, which itself closed in March 1991.

=== Unigate ===
After the formation of Unigate in 1959, further afield there were creameries in Dorrington, Shropshire, Great Torrington in north-west Devon, and St Erth (former United Dairies) in west Cornwall.

The site competed at the Royal Dairy Show in London, and the International Cheese Awards at Acton, Cheshire. By the late 1950s, it was making Cheddar, Cheshire, Double Gloucester and Leicester. Bulk milk collections began in 1972; other creameries would do this after Davidstow began this.

By 1976 it was making 72,000lb of cheese per day. Unigate sold 75% of its milk production to the Milk Marketing Board in July 1979 for £55m.

=== Dairy Crest ===
Dairy Crest had 16 creameries in 1979. Under Dairy Crest Foods, other creameries were at Sturminster Newton, which closed in 2000; and at Cannington, Somerset, which now makes yoghurt for Yeo Valley; Aspatria Creamery, which now makes Lake District Cheddar, by First Milk; and a site at Ellesmere, Shropshire, which made Cheshire cheese until 1987; the area around North Shropshire is also a main dairy industry supplier, with St Ivel making cheese at Whitchurch, Shropshire. By the late 1980s Dairy Crest Foods made a quarter of all the cheese eaten in the UK.

The site was bought by the Milk Marketing Board in 1979; in 1980 the processing division was divested as the new company Dairy Crest. In 1993 Dairy Crest decided to make Davidstow its main cheese manufacturing site, and invest £6M. In 2002 the site employed 174. Dairy Crest floated on the stock exchange in 1996.

In 2019, Dairy Crest was bought by the Canadian company Saputo Inc.

=== Environmental concerns ===
On 22 June 2022, Dairy Crest was found guilty of environmental offences over a five-year period and fined £1.5 million. This is the largest fine ever awarded for an Environment Agency conviction in the South West of England. The pollution affected the River Inny, Cornwall and included releasing a harmful biocide into the river on 16 August 2016, killing thousands of fish over a two-kilometre stretch, and coating the River Inny with a noxious, black sludge for five kilometres in 2018, through a release of a mass of suspended solids in July and August 2018.

=== Construction ===
The boiler house was added in 1968. The site was expanded in 1984 and 2001.

A £55M redevelopment opened in 2005.

=== Visits ===
- In October 1976, the Unigate factory was featured in a documentary by Desmond Hawkins, about the Waldegrave Dairy in Chewton Mendip, called 'The Man who Thought Of It', who was Joseph Harding.
- Prince Charles visited the site on Tuesday 12 July 2011 to open a new £4.2M biomass plant. It is a waste wood biomass plant for high pressure steam. Two Byworth boilers produce 7000 kg/h of steam at 23 bar, with Endress+Hauser energy monitoring. The boiler plant was built by Leadbitter from May 2010 to April 2011.

== Structure ==
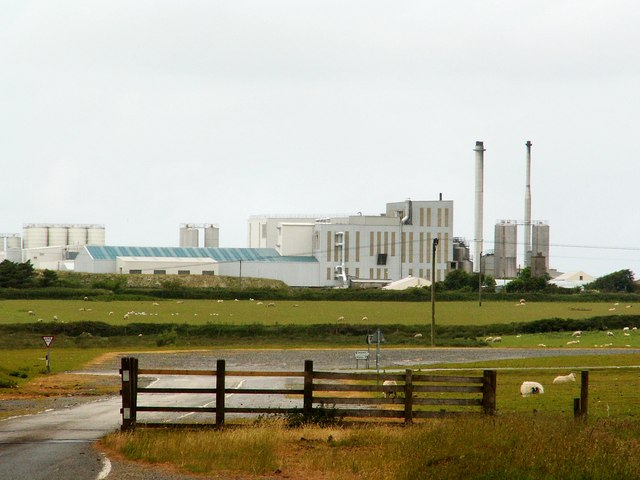
View in June 2006

It is situated at the junction of the A39 and A395 in northern Cornwall.

=== Production ===
It makes 45,000 tonnes of cheese a year.

The cheese is taken from Davidstow to the national distribution centre at Nuneaton in north-east Warwickshire, where it is stored for 12 months to mature.

Dairy Crest also had made Cathedral City at its Maelor Creamery cheese packing plant, which opened in 1976 at Marchwiel in north Wales, which was sold (with other sites that made supermarket cheese) to First Milk in 2006, then closed in 2014. The Maelor site was the largest cheese packer in Europe producing 80,000 tonnes per year. Cathedral City cheese packing moved to Nuneaton in 2009. Dairy Crest also had a former cheese plant at Johnstown, Carmarthenshire.

Around 400 farmers supply milk to the site. Cheese made includes Cathedral City Cheddar and Davidstow Cheddar. It makes Cornish Cruncher and Cornish Cove for M&S.

== See also ==
- Arla Aylesbury
- Hilmar Cheese Company in Hilmar, California, the largest cheese production site in the world
- Taw Valley Creamery of Arla Foods UK (former Milk Link)
