= List of alumni of Merton College, Oxford =

See also Former students, Fellows and current Honorary Fellows of Merton College.

Merton College, Oxford is one of the constituent colleges of the University of Oxford.

This list of Merton Fellows and alumni is grouped into centuries; where the person's life spans more than one century, the (approximate) date of matriculation is used, and given in brackets when known.

== Medieval ==
- Walter de Merton, Lord Chancellor, Bishop of Rochester (founder)
- Thomas Wilton, theologian and scholastic philosopher
- William Grisaunt, physician (1299)
- John of Gaddesden (c.1300), English physician and writer
- Archbishop Thomas Bradwardine, theologian and astronomer (1321), one of the Oxford Calculators
- William of Heytesbury (1330), one of the Oxford Calculators
- John Dumbleton (1338), one of the Oxford Calculators
- Richard Swineshead (1340), one of the Oxford Calculators
- John Wycliffe, theologian (1356)
- Robert Wikeford, Archbishop of Dublin (c. 1350)

Two additional outstanding academic figures from the early 14th century, John Duns Scotus and William of Ockham have long been claimed as Merton alumni, but there is no contemporary evidence to support this claim and as Franciscans, they would have been ineligible for fellowships at Merton.

== 16th century ==
- Sir Thomas Bodley, diplomat, scholar, and librarian (1563)
- Bishop John Jewel, theologian and Anglican divine (1535)
- Sir Henry Savile, scholar and statesman (1565)
- Richard Smyth, Regius Professor of Divinity, Merton College, and first Chancellor of the University of Douai

== 17th century ==
- John Bainbridge, astronomer (c1610)
- William Berkeley, governor of Virginia (1629)
- Admiral Robert Blake, military commander and Member of Parliament for Bridgwater (1615)
- Abiezer Coppe, (political dissenter), Ranter.
- William Harvey, physician (1645)
- Henry Newton, diplomat
- Richard Steele, politician and writer (1691)
- Anthony Wood, antiquary

== 18th century ==
- Shute Barrington, English churchman (1752)
- David Hartley, Member of Parliament and signatory to the Treaty of Paris
- George Saxby Penfold, clergyman (1788)
- John Graves Simcoe, military officer and first lieutenant governor of Upper Canada

== 19th century ==
- Max Beerbohm, author and caricaturist (1890)
- Edmund Clerihew Bentley, inventor of the Clerihew (1894)
- F. H. Bradley, philosopher (fellow from 1870)
- Edward John Cameron, British colonial administrator (1877)
- Henry Cort Harold Carpenter, British metallurgist (1896)
- Lord Randolph Churchill, British statesman (1867)
- Berdmore Compton, ecclesiastical writer
- Mandell Creighton, historian and Bishop of London (1862)
- Jose Gutierrez Guerra, Bolivian president (1890)
- Lord Halsbury, Lord Chancellor, and compiler of the Laws of England (1842)
- George Howson, reforming headmaster (1879)
- Walter Alison Phillips, historian (1882)
- George Saintsbury, writer, literary historian, scholar, critic and wine connoisseur (1863)
- Walter Scott, classical scholar (fellow from 1879)
- F. E. Smith, 1st Earl of Birkenhead, British statesman (1896, at Merton as a graduate)
- Frederick Soddy, radiochemist and Nobel Laureate in chemistry (1895)

== 20th century (matriculated up to 1960) ==
- Theodor Adorno, philosopher, sociologist, musicologist, and art critic (1934)
- Sir Leonard Allinson, former High Commissioner in Kenya and Ambassador to UN Environment Programme (1944)
- Sir Roger Bannister, middle-distance runner and neurologist (1950)
- Sir Lennox Berkeley, composer (1922)
- Sir Basil Blackwell, bookseller and publisher (1907)
- Edmund Blunden, Professor of Poetry (1931)
- Frank Bough, broadcaster (1952)
- Collin Bowen, archaeologist and landscape historian
- Robert Byron, travel writer
- John Carey, literary critic (Merton Professor of English 1975–2001)
- Nikhil Chakravarty, Indian journalist (1936)
- Leonard Cheshire, RAF pilot and philanthropist (1936)
- Pit Corder, Professor of Applied Linguistics (1936)
- Guy Davenport, literary critic, translator, writer (1950)
- Michael Davie, journalist and newspaper editor (1942)
- Dhani Nivat, Regent of Thailand (1904)
- Maurice Dickson, cricketer and rugby footballer (1900)
- Keith Douglas, poet (1938)
- Pablo Eisenberg (born 1932), American scholar, social justice advocate, and tennis player
- T. S. Eliot, poet and Nobel Laureate for literature (1914)
- Verrier Elwin, British-born Indian anthropologist and tribal activist
- Northrop Frye, literary critic (1936)
- John Gallas, poet and educator
- Roger Lancelyn Green, children's writer and biographer (1937)
- Erich S. Gruen, classical scholar (Rhodes Scholar, 1957–1960, Visiting Fellow 1974)
- Stuart Hall, cultural theorist (1951)
- George Haskins, Algernon Sydney Biddle Professor of Law at the University of Pennsylvania Law School
- Sir Hector Hetherington, Principal of the University of Glasgow (1912)
- Sir Tony Hoare, computer scientist (1952)
- Ian Holbourn, artist, author, educator, and survivor of the RMS Lusitania
- Andrew Irvine, mountaineer (1921)
- Sir Jeremy Isaacs, broadcaster and impresario (1951)
- P. J. Kavanagh, poet, lecturer, actor, broadcaster and columnist (1951)
- Kris Kristofferson, actor and Grammy Award-winning musician (1958)
- Professor Anthony Leggett, physicist, Nobel Laureate in physics (1959)
- John Lucas, philosopher (JRF 1953, Fellow 1960)
- Louis MacNeice, poet (1926)
- Reginald Maudling, politician (1933)
- Christopher Middleton, poet (1948)
- Bruce Mitchell, philologist (1952)
- R. I. Moore, medieval historian (1959)
- John Mulgan, writer, journalist and editor (1933)
- Airey Neave, politician (1934)
- Terence O'Brien, British ambassador to Nepal, Burma and Indonesia (1940)
- Sir Michael Palliser, diplomat (1940)
- David Parry-Jones, sports commentator and writer (1952)
- Fred Paterson, lawyer and politician (1922)
- Wilder Penfield, neurosurgeon (1914)
- Anthony Price, author of espionage thrillers (1949)
- Reynolds Price, author and professor at Duke University (1955)
- Sir George Radda, scientist (1957)
- Martin Read, Chairman of the Senior Salaries Review Body and Wincanton plc
- William Lindsay Renwick, Professor of English Literature at King's College, University of Durham, and the University of Edinburgh (1920)
- Cecil Roth, scholar, historian (1905)
- Eric Simms, ornithologist (1939)
- Howard K. Smith, journalist and broadcaster (1937)
- Sir Peter Tapsell, Father of the House of Commons (1950)
- Professor Nikolaas Tinbergen, ethologist (1949)
- J. R. R. Tolkien, author and Merton Professor of English (1945)
- Sir Geoffrey Vickers (1913)
- Eric A. Walker, professor emeritus of Imperial History at the University of Cambridge (1908)
- The Honourable Sir John Hamilton Wallace, New Zealand judge (1955)
- Angus Wilson, author (1932)
- Brian Winston, journalist and media academic (1960)
- Patrick Wright, diplomat (1951)
- Yang Xianyi, translator (1936)

== 20th century (matriculated since 1960) ==
- Azeem Azhar, entrepreneur
- Dhiren Bhagat, journalist
- Roger Bootle, economist (1970)
- Peter Braam (1987), computer scientist, mathematician and entrepreneur
- Michael Fenwick Briggs, business man (1944)
- Colin Bundy, academic (1968 Rhodes Scholar)
- Iain Burnside, pianist and accompanist (1974)
- Simon Burton, Clerk of the Parliaments since 2021 (1983)
- Andy Cato, musician and DJ (1991)
- Alex Chisholm, Permanent Secretary for the Department for Business, Energy and Industrial Strategy (1986)
- Dr Anna Clark, tutor in Roman history at Christ Church, Oxford (1999)
- James Clark, author of groff and open source software developer (1982)
- John A. Claughton, previous Chief Master of King Edward's School, Birmingham and the Foundation of the Schools of King Edward VI (1975)
- Juliet Davenport, businesswoman (1986)
- Howard Davies, Director, London School of Economics (1969)
- Eleanor Dickey, classicist (1989)
- Professor Alex Edmans, economist (1998)
- Pat Fish (Patrick Huntrods), musician and songwriter (1976)
- Paul Foot, comedian (1992)
- David Freud, investment banker (1969)
- John Selwyn Gilbert, television writer, director and producer (1961)
- Gareth Glyn, composer (1969)
- Clare Griffiths, Professor of Modern History at Cardiff University (1988)
- Steven Gunn, Professor of History at Merton College (1979)
- Mark Haddon, author (1981)
- Adam Hart-Davis, broadcaster (1962)
- Anthony Holden, writer, broadcaster, critic (1966)
- Marnie Hughes-Warrington, Professor of History at The Australian National University (1992)
- MacDonald P. Jackson, emeritus Professor at the University of Auckland (1963)
- Tim Jackson, auctioneer (1983)
- Alec Jeffreys, geneticist (1968)
- Anne Keast-Butler, director of GCHQ
- Sir Ian Kershaw, historian (1966)
- John J Kirby, attorney (1962)
- Chris Laidlaw, rugby player, diplomat, MP, radio host and author (1969)
- Brian Leveson, udge (1967)
- Jonathan Lord, MP (1981)
- Denis MacShane, Labour MP (1966)
- Joanna Masel, Professor of Ecology and Evolutionary Biology at the University of Arizona (1997)
- Sir Callum McCarthy, former chairman of the Financial Services Authority (1962)
- Alister McGrath, scientist and theologian (1976 Domus Senior Scholar)
- Dominic Minghella, screenwriter (1986)
- John Mitchinson, writer and publisher (1982)
- Tim Mitchison, cell biologist (1977)
- John David Morley, novelist (1966)
- Marc Morris, historian (1998)
- Arthur Mutambara, Zimbabwean politician, former Zimbabwean Deputy Prime Minister, roboticist (1991 Rhodes scholar)
- HIM Naruhito, Emperor of Japan (1982)
- Jesse Norman, MP (1981)
- Tony Orchard, inorganic chemist (as a graduate)
- Hugh Osmond, co-founder of Punch Taverns (1980)
- Andrew Pettegree, historian (1976)
- Diane Purkiss, Professor of English Literature at Keble College, Oxford (1984)
- Kieron Quirke, TV writer (1997)
- Michael Ridpath, author (1979)
- Dana Scott, logician
- Sir Howard Stringer, chief executive officer of Sony (1961, Honorary Fellow)
- Ben Summerskill, Chief Executive of Stonewall, 2003-2014 (1981)
- Michael Szonyi, professor of Chinese history at Harvard University (1990 Rhodes Scholar)
- Yukio Takasu, diplomat (1970)
- Michael Tatham, senior British diplomat (1988)
- Mark Thompson, broadcaster, director general of the BBC (1976)
- Irene Tracey, neuroscientist (1985)
- Rick Trainor, Principal of King's College London (1971)
- Liz Truss, MP for South-West Norfolk, the UK's shortest-serving Prime Minister (1993)
- Catherine Tucker, Sloan Distinguished Professor of Management Science and Professor of Marketing at MIT Sloan (1996)
- Ed Vaizey, MP for Wantage (1986)
- Thomas Vargish, professor of English at Dartmouth College (1960s)
- Anna Watts, astrophysicist (1992)
- Alannah Weston, Chair of the Selfridges Group
- Dame Philippa Whipple, judge (1984)
- Professor Sir Andrew Wiles, mathematician (1971), famous for proving Fermat's Last Theorem in 1994
- Alexander Williams, animator (1986)

== 21st century ==
- HIH Princess Akiko of Mikasa of Japan (2010)
- Charles Finch, author (2003)
- Leana Wen, President of the Planned Parenthood Federation of America (2007)
