= Tirlán =

Irish dairy co-operative

- Company type: Cooperative
- Industry: Dairy
- Predecessor: Avonmore Creameries Federation and others.
- Founded: 1997; 29 years ago
- Headquarters: Kilkenny, Ireland
- Area served: Global
- Members: 11,200
- Subsidiaries: Glanbia plc. (31.5% shareholding); Glanbia Ireland DAC (100% shareholding)
- Website: tirlan.com

Tirlán (known as Glanbia Co-operative Society Limited from 1999 until 2022) is an Irish dairy co-operative based in Kilkenny, Ireland. Its catchment area mainly covers the South-East and Midland regions of Ireland. Tirlán processes an annual volume of 3.2 billion litres of milk and handles 190,000 tonnes of green grain.

As of 2024 it has 2,300 employees and revenues of €2.53 billion. Tirlán is divided into three main business divisions: Agribusiness (retail stores and farm services), Consumer (consumer brands) and Ingredients (value added solutions).

The company rebranded as Tirlán following a corporate merger in 2022, in which ownership returned to its farmer-members. Its predecessor Glanbia plc will retain and continue to operate under the Glanbia name as an entirely separate entity. Tirlán remained the largest shareholder in Glanbia plc, with a 31.9% shareholding.

== History ==
Avonmore logo

The co-operative has its roots in a series of amalgamations of small rural co-operative creamery societies throughout Counties Tipperary, Kilkenny, Laois, and Kildare, which formed Avonmore Creameries Federation in 1966. Each of the 36 original creameries became a branch of Avonmore.

The co-operative succeeded due to the dedication and cooperation among farmers, management, workers, and the community at large. Apart from milk collection, creameries provided invaluable services to the farming communities, including butter making, on site shops, grain drying and milling, and agricultural contract work.

According to Glanbia Collections in the Kilkenny Archives at St Kieran's College, Kilkenny, Avonmore Creameries Federation was created through the amalgamation of the following village creameries, which are listed among their archives:

- Ballingarry Co-Operative Creamery Ltd
- Ballyhale Co-Operative Creamery Dairy Society Ltd
- Ballypatrick Co-Operative Creamery Ltd
- Avonmore Creameries Ltd
- Ballyragget Co-Operative Creamery Ltd
- Bennettsbridge Co-Operative Creamery Ltd
- Callan Co-op Creamery and Dairy Society Ltd
- Castlehale Co-Operative Dairy Society Ltd
- Castlecomer Co-Operative Creamery Ltd
- Donaghmore Co-Operative Creamery Ltd
- Dungarvan Co-Operative Creamery Ltd
- Freshford Co-Operative Creamery Ltd
- Glenmore Co-Operative Creamery Ltd
- Graiguecullen Corn & Coal Co. Ltd
- IDA Co-Operative Creamery Ltd
- Kells Co-Operative Agricultural & Dairy Society Ltd
- Kilmanagh Co-Operative Creamery Ltd
- Kilkenny City Co-Operative Creamery Ltd
- Leinster Milk Producers Association Ltd
- Loughcullen Co-Operative Creamery Ltd
- Miloko Co-Operative Society Ltd
- Knockavendagh & Moylgass (Killenaule) Co-Operative Creamery Society Ltd
- Muckalee Co-Operative Dairy Society Ltd
- Mullinavat Co-Operative Creamery Society Ltd
- Piltown Co-Operative Society Ltd
- Slieverue Co-Operative Creamery Ltd
- Shelbourne Co-Operative Agriculture Society Ltd
- Windgap Co-Operative Dairy Society Ltd
- Letterkenny Timber Co. Ltd
- The Bacon Company of Ireland
- Inch Creamery (to be catalogued)
- Barrowvale
- Goresbridge Creamery (to be catalogued)

=== 1960–1983 – Formation of Avonmore and Waterford ===
Initially, co-operatives faced major downsides: they lacked significant capital-raising instruments that allowed for expansion and development, and they lacked the legal and financial protection afforded by corporate structures. To realise the benefits of scale and diversification, the 1960s many of these small, locally focused co-operative creameries across Ireland amalgamated. Waterford Co-op Society was formed in 1964 upon the amalgamation of Kilmeaden Co-operative, Carrick on Suir Co-operative, Dungarvan Co-operative, Gaultier Co-operative, and Rathgormack Co-operative.

Avonmore Creameries Federation was founded in 1966 when 36 smaller co-ops joined forces. The following year, Avonmore entered into a joint venture with Unigate Limited to construct at Ballyragget the largest dairy processing facility in Europe at that time, and which became Ireland's largest milk producer by the 1970s.

=== 1984–1996 – Flotation and expansion ===
After the introduction of European milk quotas in 1984, the domestic growth opportunities for Irish co-operatives and their members were very limited. Waterford Co-op Society and Avonmore Creameries both realised that to expand they would have to seek out new markets outside Ireland. They recognised that the best way to fund such an expansion was through a stock market flotation. Accordingly, Avonmore Foods plc was floated on the Irish Stock Exchange on 6 September 1988 and Waterford Foods plc was floated a month later on 6 October 1988. This provided the funding to expand their product offerings while also expanding their geographic footprint.

Avonmore Foods plc acquired a number of small cheese plants in the US to form a platform for their market-leading US cheese business, which is part of Glanbia plc today.

=== 1997–2000 – The amalgamation ===
After their flotations in 1988, Avonmore Foods plc and Waterford Foods plc pursued similar growth strategies. It made commercial sense for both to amalgamate. On 4 September 1997 Avonmore Foods plc and Waterford Foods plc merged to form Avonmore Waterford Group (AWG) plc. After agreement was reached in a special general meeting in Waterford, attended by almost 3,200 of the Waterford Co-op's 5,000 shareholders, a joint statement of the Chairmen read: "It would lead to an Irish, farmer-controlled food company with the scale and resources to successfully compete in a highly competitive international marketplace". The company became the fourth biggest dairy processor in Europe and the fourth biggest cheese producer in the world.

In 1999, the business was rebranded Glanbia plc, which means "pure food" in Irish.

=== 2001–2023 – Glanbia Ireland acquisition ===
Between 2001 and 2004 Glanbia implemented a significant reorganisation aimed at reshaping its portfolio and providing the foundation for future growth. In 2008, they decided to vertically integrate with the acquisition of a customer, Optimum Nutrition. In 2013, Glanbia Ingredients Ireland purchased Wexford Creamery for €20 million.

In 2017, a strategic joint venture called Glanbia Ireland was created by Glanbia Co-operative (who controlled a 60% share) and Glanbia plc (40% share). This company managed the network of over 11 production facilities and 52 Agri retail branches.

In 2021, the members of Glanbia Co-operative approved the acquisition of Glanbia Ireland along with its dairy processing business. The sale completed in April 2022, in which the co-operative purchased Glanbia plc's 40% shareholding. This marked the return of direct ownership of the dairy processing business to its farmer-members. Subsequently both the co-operative and Glanbia Ireland rebranded as Tirlán to differentiate themselves from Glanbia plc, which remained a separate entity.

== Naming controversy ==
Following the rebranding to Tirlán, the company faced criticism from Irish speakers over the spelling of the Co-operative's new name. According to the company, the name "Tirlán" stands for "land of abundance". The name is a combination of the Irish words tír which stands for 'land' or 'territory', and lán which stands for 'full'. Irish language speakers argued that tír means 'country' but tir (without a síneadh fada) is not a recognised word in the Irish language. It was also pointed out that the Irish word for 'abundance' is neart or flúirse and not lán.

== Brands ==
Tirlán today owns well-known Irish consumer brands.

Avonmore is the flagship brand for the group. Their product range includes fresh milk, butter, cream, soup, rice, and custard.

Fresh milk is still sold under a number of legacy brands that were bought by Tirlán and retain strong geographic ties to certain areas: Premier Dairies in the Greater Dublin Area; Snowcream based in the South-East and Midland regions; and CMP around Cork. Cheese is sold under two major brands: Kilmeaden cheese and Wexford Creamery.

In 2019 Tirlán launched a new consumer brand in the United States, "Truly Grass Fed", which focuses on the sale of grass-fed cheese and butter. Their "Truly Gluten Free" range was launched in 2024 and focuses on Gluten Free Oat Milk from their 110 Irish Family farm suppliers.
