= List of honorary fellows of Merton College, Oxford =

Honorary Fellows of Merton College, Oxford.

- Sir Robert Andrew
- Dame Kelyn Bacon
- Sir Andrew Baker
- Sir Christopher Ball
- Sir Jack Beatson
- Dinah Birch
- Julian Blackwell
- Alison Blake
- Sir John Boardman
- William Cooke
- Sir Howard Davies
- Francis Finlay
- Gerry Grimstone, Baron Grimstone of Boscobel
- Erich Gruen
- Adam Hart-Davis
- Sir Antony Hoare
- Jonathan Hodgkin
- Bernard Hogan-Howe, Baron Hogan-Howe
- David Holmes
- Sir Jeremy Isaacs
- Sir Alec Jeffreys
- Vassos Karageorghis
- Anne Keast-Butler
- Sir Ian Kershaw
- Sir Anthony Leggett
- Anastasios Leventis
- Sir Brian Leveson
- Richard Levin
- The Most Reverend Michael Lewis
- Sir Callum McCarthy
- HM Emperor Naruhito of Japan
- Martin Ney
- Robert Paxton
- Timothy Phillips
- Martha Piper
- Dame Jessica Rawson
- Sir Martin Read
- Lyndal Roper
- Dana Scott
- Sir Howard Stringer
- Sir Martin Taylor
- Sir Mark Thompson
- Irene Tracey
- Sir Rick Trainor
- Peter Warry
- Sir Guy Weston
- Dame Philippa Whipple
- Rowan Williams, Baron Williams of Oystermouth
- Katherine Willis, Baroness Willis of Summertown
- Sue Woodford-Hollick, Lady Hollick
- Rt Revd Dr Nicholas Wright
