= Davidstow Cheddar =

Brand of Cheddar cheese from Cornwall

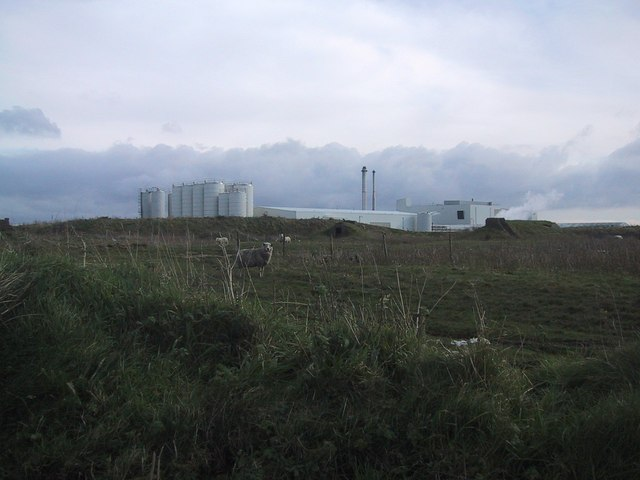
Davidstow Creamery

Davidstow Cheddar is a brand of Cheddar cheese manufactured by Dairy Crest, at the Davidstow Creamery in Cornwall, England, United Kingdom, alongside Cathedral City Cheddar.

== Production ==
Cheddar cheese has been produced at Davidstow for over 70 years; the plant was set up there in 1951 by Cow & Gate. Milk is supplied by 300 farms in Cornwall and Devon, all within a 50-mile (80 km) radius. The Davidstow plant is the largest in Britain, having been upgraded in 2004, and has the capacity to produce 1,000 tonnes of Davidstow and Cathedral City cheese per week.

== Awards ==
Davidstow won Gold trophies at the International Cheese Awards in Nantwich in 2010 and 2011.
