= Glanbia =

Irish global food corporation

Glanbia plc
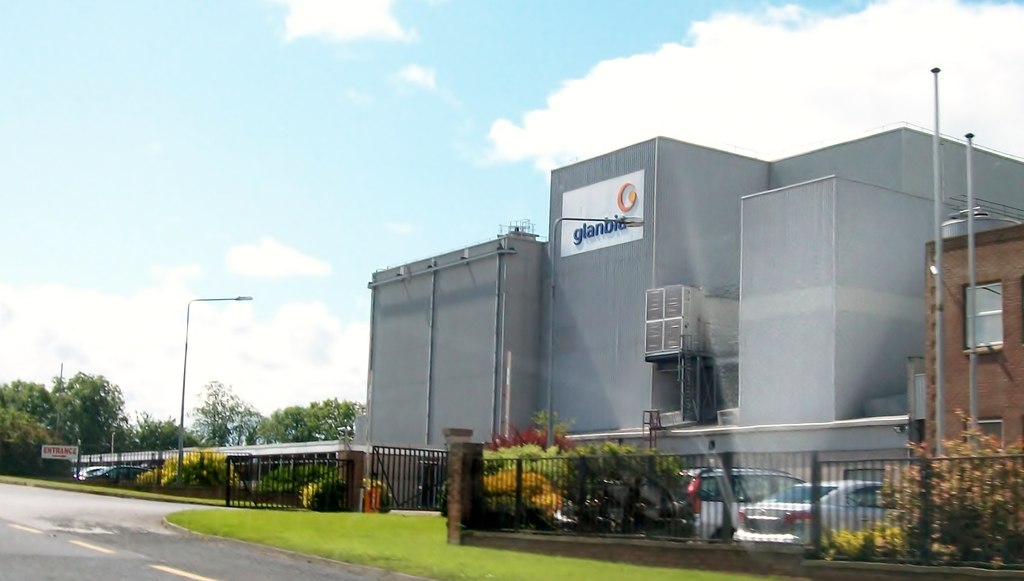
- Plant at Burrenrea, County Cavan
- Type: Public limited company
- Traded as: Euronext Dublin: GL9; LSE: GLB; ISEQ 20 component
- ISIN: IE0000669501
- Industry: Food processing
- Founded: 1997; 29 years ago
- Headquarters: Kilkenny, Ireland
- Area served: Worldwide
- Key people: Paul Duffy (Group Chairman); Hugh McGuire (CEO)
- Products: Ingredients; Protein supplements; Energy bars; Dairy products; Dairy-free products
- Brands: Optimum Nutrition
- Revenue: ▲$5.4 billion (2023)
- Operating income: ▲$392.2 million (2023)
- Net income: ▲$347.7 million (2023)
- Total assets: ▲$3,799.1 million (2023)
- Total equity: ▲$2,132.6m billion (2023)
- Number of employees: 5,534 (2023)
- Website: www.glanbia.com

Glanbia plc (/ˈɡlɒnbiə/ GLON-bee-ə) (Note: The name is derived from the Irish words glan (pronounced [ɡlˠanˠ], "clean"/"pure") and bia (pronounced [bʲiə], "food"). However, it is not grammatical Irish; the correct translation of "pure food" would be bia glan.) is an Irish multinational nutrition company that owns several consumer brands that produce products such as food supplements and ingredients businesses. Glanbia is headquartered in Kilkenny, Ireland with over 5,500 employees in over 30 countries around the world. Glanbia’s consumer brands and ingredients are sold or distributed in over 130 countries. North America is the company’s largest market, and it also has a presence in Europe, Middle East, Asia-Pacific and Latin America. Glanbia's primary listing is on Euronext Dublin. Glanbia comprises three divisions: Glanbia Nutritionals, Glanbia Performance Nutrition and Joint Ventures.

Given the company's origins in the co-operative movement, farmer-suppliers of the company retain a significant interest in the company. Tirlán remains the largest shareholder in Glanbia plc. as of 2022 and retains the right to nominate a number of non-executive directors to the board of the company in line with their mutual Relationship Agreement.

== Post 1960s dairy consolidation ==
Dairy products have long formed the backbone of Ireland's agricultural sector, and by the early 19th century the country was amongst the world's largest producers. In 1848, Ireland accounted for two thirds of butter imports into the port of London. Irish butter came under pressure by competitors modernising their systems with newly developed cream separators. As a consequence, Irish butter exports to London dramatically fell in the early 1880s.

The new technologies fundamentally transformed the country's dairy sector, which had been operated by independent farmers. In order to support the cost of new equipment, dairy farmers grouped together to build centralised processing facilities – known as 'creameries'. In the late 1880s, farmers adopted the cooperative format, often to enter into direct competition with the private creameries. Farmers who supplied milk to the co-ops were better served than those who sold it to the private creameries. In time, most of those businesses found that they were unable to compete with the farmer co-operatives, and many sold their premises and businesses to the co-ops.

The numbers of creameries increased substantially by 1900, and by the eve of World War I, the country counted nearly 800 plants. In spite of the scarcities, political unrest and violent incidents, the World War I era had been a prosperous period for farmers. The crisis in the country's agricultural market following the war led to a large number of creameries to shut down.

Government policy in the 1920s further consolidated the dairy market. The number of creameries was reduced to 17 large-scale facilities in the years following World War II. At the same time, the number of cooperatives in Ireland had shrunk back to fewer than 220. Butter remained the Irish dairy industry's core product, accounting for the majority of the creameries' production.

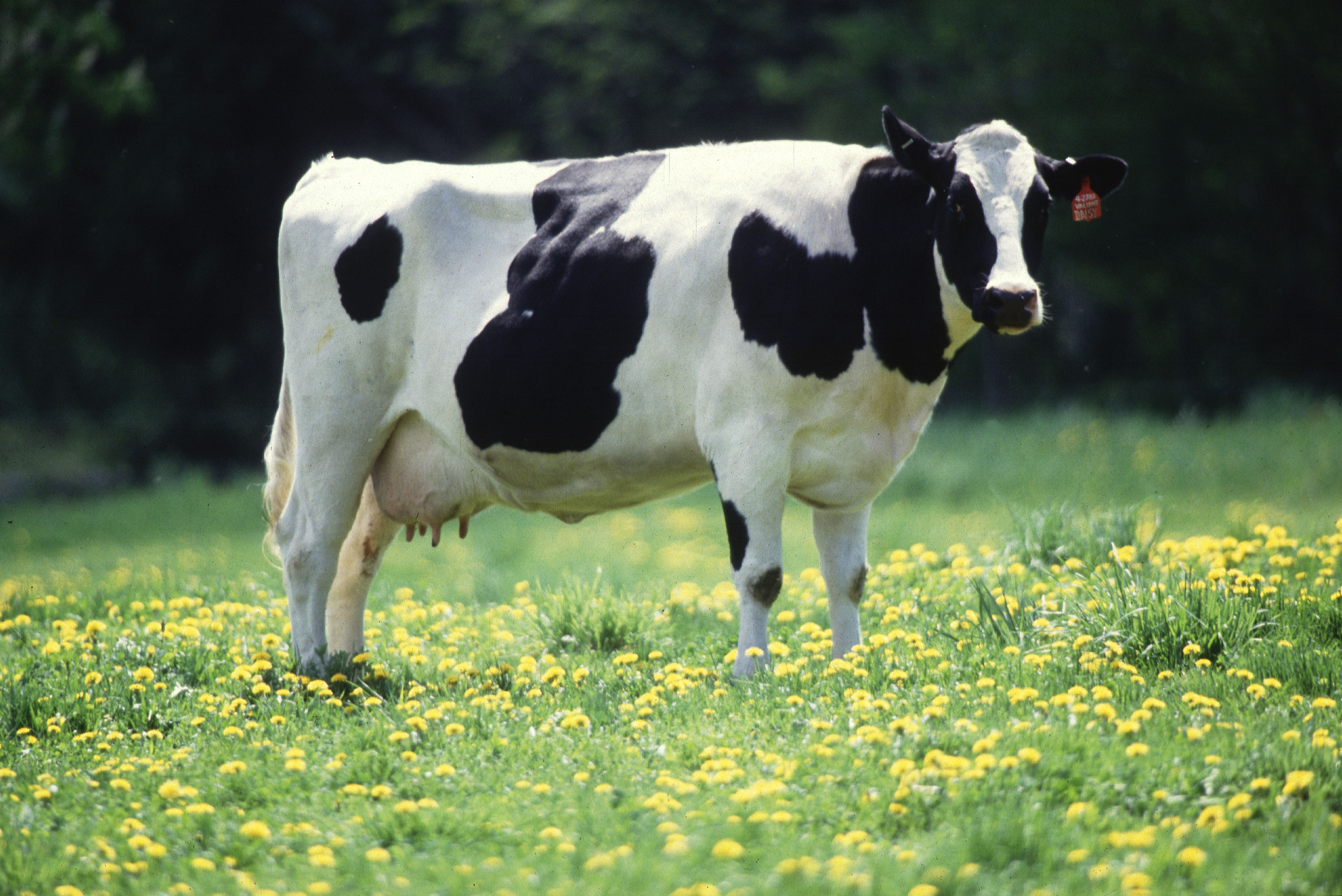
Holstein cow, the dominant breed in industrialised dairying today

The members of five co-operatives agreed to join forces and become Waterford Co-operative Society Limited in 1964. The formation of Waterford Co-operative in 1964 was the first of the major amalgamations and it was the beginning of a story that would be repeated throughout Ireland over the next 40 years. The size of the co-operative gave them the opportunity to produce a bigger range of products. With its head start, Waterford was able to grow and a decade later, in 1974, this scale of operation would help in winning the French Yoplait franchise to produce the prestige range of yogurts at Inch, County Wexford – an association that continues to this day. Waterford continued growing throughout the 1970s, amalgamating with a number of other, smaller creameries.

In the meantime, 25 other cooperatives agreed to merge to establish the Avonmore Creameries Federation by 1966. The Ballyhale C.D.S. 100 year anniversary booklet records that a federation of 25 Co-op Creameries originally emerged in January 1965 under the umbrella of Avonmore Creameries Ltd., that shares were taken in the new entity by the society and that in following years a Ballyragget milk processing factory was built. Ireland entered the Common Market in 1970. The first bulk milk collections took place from 1973, when the amalgamation was formalised. Ballyhale C.D.S. became one of 20 members of Avonmore Farmers Ltd.; the other founding members being Castlehale, Mullinavat, Iverk, Piltown, Carrigeen, Kilmacow, Ballyragget, South Tipperary, Monastarevan, Muckalee, Barrowvale, Kells, Windgap, Brandonvale, Bennetsbridge, Castlecomer, Freshford, Donaghmore and Fennor. According to Glanbia Collections in Kilkenny Archives at St Kieran's College, Kilkenny, the Avonmore Coop brand was created through the merger of the Village Creameries that are included among their archives for:

- Ballingarry Co-Operative Creamery Ltd.
- Ballyhale Co-Operative Creamery Dairy Society Ltd.
- Ballypatrick Co-Operative Creamery Ltd.
- Avonmore Creameries Ltd.
- Ballyragget Co-Operative Creamery Ltd.
- Bennettsbridge Co-Operative Creamery Ltd.
- Callan Co-op Creamery and Dairy Society Ltd.
- Castlehale Co-Operative Dairy Society Ltd.
- Castlecomer Co-Operative Creamery Ltd.
- Donaghmore Co-Operative Creamery Ltd.
- Dungarvan Co Waterford Co-Operative Creamery Ltd.
- Freshford Co-Operative Creamery Ltd.
- Glenmore, County Kilkenny Co-Operative Creamery Ltd.
- Graiguecullen, County Carlow Corn & Coal Co. Ltd.
- IDA Co-Operative Creamery Ltd.
- Kells, County Kilkenny Co-Operative Agricultural & Dairy Society Ltd.
- Kilmanagh, County Kilkenny Co-Operative Creamery Ltd.
- Kilkenny City Co-Operative Creamery Ltd.
- Leinster Milk Producers Association Ltd.
- Loughcullen County Kilkenny Co-Operative Creamery Ltd.
- Miloko Co-Operative Society Ltd.
- Knockavendagh & Moyglass Killenaule Co-Operative Creamery Society Ltd.
- Muckalee County Kilkenny Co-Operative Dairy Society Ltd.
- Mullinavat Co-Operative Creamery Society Ltd.
- Piltown Co-Operative Society Ltd.
- Slieverue Co-Operative Creamery Ltd.
- Shelbourne Co-Operative Agriculture Society Ltd.
- Windgap Co-Operative Dairy Society Ltd.
- Letterkenny Timber Co. Ltd.
- The Bacon Company of Ireland
- Inch Creamery (Awaiting to be catalogued)
- Barrowvale, Goresbridge Creamery (Awaiting to be catalogued)

Backed by the British dairy giant Unigate, the new federation began the construction of a new multi-purpose dairy plant in Ballyragget, County Kilkenny. The plant was the biggest processing facility in Europe at that time. Today, the Ballyragget facility is the largest integrated dairy site in Europe, processing about 20% of the Irish milk pool. Avonmore originally focused on the production of butter and powdered skim milk. On 1 September 1973, 20 societies amalgamated, thus creating Avonmore Farmers Ltd. As time moved on, Unigate's involvement changed and, in 1978, the cooperative bought back Unigate's stake in the Ballyragget facility.

== International 1980s expansion ==
Both Avonmore and Waterford expanded into the 1980s. At home, both companies established brand names, while Waterford continued with its Yoplait franchise. The two co-operatives continued to add product lines. Avonmore, for example, launched Avonmore Fresh Milk on the Dublin market on 1 June 1981. The two companies, Avonmore and Waterford, went public in the 1980s. Avonmore went first, becoming Avonmore Foods plc on 6 September 1988. Waterford Foods plc was launched on the Irish Stock Exchange (ISEQ) on 6 October 1988. Both groups remained majority controlled by the dairy farmers that had formed the original co-operatives. With new access to capital, both companies embarked on a programme of expansion.

Avonmore's strategy included growing the dairy business in the UK and US. They also decided to grow the business through acquisition. Over the next nine years they made 28 acquisitions in Ireland, the UK, the US, Hungary, Germany and Belgium. The major developments were in the UK with liquid milk and mozzarella cheese and in the US with cheese production in Wisconsin, Illinois and Idaho. In the years following flotation, Avonmore also invested in the meat business in Ireland.

In 1989, a year after the establishment of Waterford Foods plc, the Group bought Galloway West in the US heartland dairying state of Wisconsin. The company manufactured cheese, condensed milk and food ingredients. Later in the year, Waterford bought A.Heald Limited of Manchester, a company that operated in the liquid milk and fruit juice business. Waterford also expanded in Ireland with the move into the prized Dublin milk market. In 1995, Waterford bought The Cheese Company, one of the two largest cheese manufacturers in Great Britain. Both organisations were focused on similar growth strategies at home and overseas. Speculation was, therefore, rife as to a possible merger between the two dairy giants. The talks began and ended without agreement in 1991.

== Merger with Waterford ==
Waterford's expansion came at a cost, and the group struggled to maintain profitability in the mid-1990s. By 1997, after Waterford posted a profit warning, the group again found itself in merger talks with Avonmore. On 13 April 1997, Waterford confirmed that it had received a formal approach from Avonmore and advised that the Waterford Board was considering the approach. The prize for a successful merger would be significant: an Irish-based, world-scale food company. This proposed coming together would represent the biggest amalgamation in the history of the Irish dairy industry and possibly of Irish agribusiness.

Intensive dialogue took place between Avonmore and Waterford throughout April and May 1997. On 26 May, the Boards of Waterford Foods plc and Waterford Co-operative Society met to consider amended proposals from Avonmore Foods plc and Avonmore Creameries Ltd. The merger proposals provoked serious debates at numerous shareholder meetings throughout Waterford and Avonmore. Some shareholders had strong reservations and among their concerns were issues such as perceived loss of identity, dominance by one party over another, relative valuations of the two organisations, size and scale of the new entity, representation and weakening of farmer control. The majority of shareholders believed the merger was the right option for both organisations.

The first vote took place on 11 July 1997, exactly three months after the merger was formally proposed. The first vote followed an intensive six-week programme of shareholder information meeting throughout the Waterford and Avonmore areas. The successful merger of Avonmore Creameries Limited and Waterford Co-operatives Society, on 4 September 1997, formed the new Avonmore Waterford Co-operative Society. On the same date, the merger of Avonmore Foods plc and Waterford Foods plc, formed the new Avonmore Waterford Group (AWG) plc.

== 1990s reorganisation ==
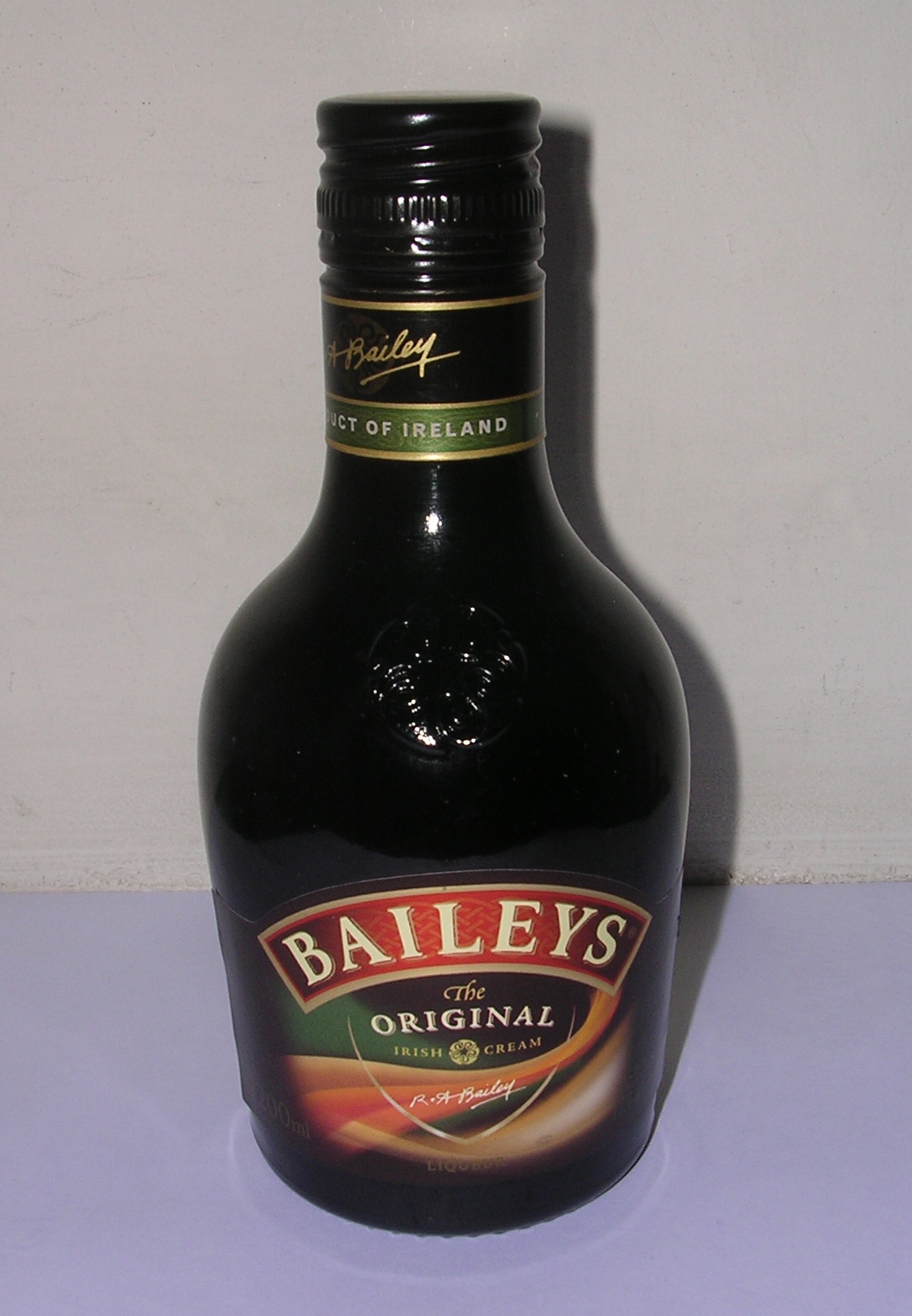
Glanbia, principal cream supplier to Baileys Irish Cream

The 1997 merger created the fourth biggest dairy processor in Europe and the fourth biggest cheese producer in the world. The Avonmore Waterford Group announced a reorganisation programme to increase their competitiveness. The strategy was to concentrate food ingredients activities in large-scale facilities in Ireland and the US. The US development strategy focused on the Avonmore West operation in Idaho which benefited from scale, location, and a growing milk supply. Following the US$20 million investment programme, Avonmore West became a supplier of dairy food and nutritional ingredients. As a result, the company disposed of its smaller cheese business in Wisconsin.

In Ireland, food ingredients activities were to be located mainly at Ballyragget and Virginia. Within the consumer food business, liquid milk operations were to be located at Ballytore, Waterford, and Drogheda. These decisions resulted in the closure of smaller facilities.

In the UK, the Group closed its Appleby cheese facility and also disposed of the Manchester-based juice business during 1997. The cost-saving measures targeted to save £20 million in 1998 and £40 million in 1999. It was anticipated that the programme would reduce jobs in AWG from 11,900 to 10,600. Job losses would be 750 in Ireland and 550 in the UK.

By May 1999, the reorganisation programme, announced in November 1997, was virtually complete. The Ballyragget site had been enhanced to accommodate the additional milk volumes. In the US, the Group was investing US$36 million in Idaho to increase cheese production by 30 percent and dairy-based food ingredients production by 22 percent. On 1 June 1999, the Group announced two important strategic sales. The first was the disposal of the UK liquid milk operations to Express Dairies, for £125 million. The second was the sale of its Irish beef processing operations to Dawn Meats for £10 million.

== New corporate identity ==
On 15 February 1999, an Extraordinary General Meeting and Special General Meeting were held to seek the necessary approval for the introduction of a new name. The change of title from Avonmore Waterford Group to Glanbia became official on 4 March 1999. The name Glanbia has its roots in the Irish language – Glanbia means "pure food" in Irish.

On 11 August 2000, Glanbia announced a joint venture with Leprino Foods. Leprino was the world's largest producer of mozzarella cheese. As part of the joint venture, Leprino Foods took a 49 per cent interest in Glanbia Cheese UK and granted exclusive use of Leprino's patented technology to Glanbia.

International joint ventures became a key element of the group's growth strategy. Consequently, in October 2003, Glanbia and PZ Cussons plc announced a €20 million joint venture to build a new factory in Nigeria to supply evaporated milk and milk powders to the Nigerian market. The name selected for the new joint venture company was Nutricima. Glanbia entered into yet another joint venture, this time with the Great Southwest Agency in New Mexico, US. Building commenced at Southwest Cheese in January 2004 and the official opening of Southwest Cheese took place in 2006.

Glanbia continued to refine its focus, targeting the new and fast-growing 'nutritional' foods segment. In 2003, the company announced its intention to exit the fresh meat market which was subsequently sold in a management buy-out in 2008.

== Nutritional foods ==
After establishing a nutritional business in January 2003, Glanbia acquired the German-based Kortus Food Ingredients Services (KFIS) in 2004. KFIS specialises in the production, research, and development of micronutrient premixes. The purchase increased Glanbia's product range and brought further access to markets in Germany and Central Europe. On 6 September 2006, Glanbia announced the acquisition of the California-based micronutrient premix business, Seltzer Companies Inc. The acquisition of Seltzer was a logical addition to the previously acquired KFIS. Both businesses have since changed their names to Glanbia Nutritionals. In 2007, Glanbia further expanded their micronutrient premix business with the completion of a new premix plant in Suzhou, China.

As part of its international expansion, Glanbia acquired the Canadian nutritional business Pizzey's Milling in August 2007. Pizzey's, which mills flaxseed, created a way into the North American omega-3 market.

Glanbia again expanded its presence in the North American market in 2008 through its acquisition of the Illinois-based sports supplement firm Optimum Nutrition (ON). ON has a strong presence in the US market for whey-based sports supplements. In January 2011, Glanbia announced the acquisition of Bio-Engineered Supplements and Nutrition (BSN), extending their sports nutrition portfolio. BSN is a developer and distributor of nutritional products designed for health, training, physique development and performance.

== Proposed Irish dairy division sale to farmers ==
In April 2010, Glanbia plc announced plans to sell its Irish dairy and agri-business division to the Glanbia Co-Operative Society. The farmer-led co-op owns 54.6% of the company. The Irish dairy and agri-business includes brands such as Kilmeaden, Avonmore and Yoplait. The deal was aimed at freeing up Glanbia plc to pursue its global cheese and nutritional ambitions, but it failed to achieve the necessary three-quarters approval from the co-op's members on 10 May, falling just short at 73%.

On 25 November 2012, Glanbia disposed of 60% of its Irish dairy processing business to Glanbia Co-Operative Society Limited (the "Society"). As a result, the Irish dairy processing business, now called Glanbia Ingredients Ireland Limited ("GIIL")became an associate of Glanbia plc.

== Growth ==
2014 – Glanbia acquires Danish sports nutrition company Nutramino for up to €20 million.

2014 – Glanbia acquires US sports nutrition specialist Isopure for $153m (€118m).

2015 – Glanbia completes $217m acquisition of US protein bar specialist thinkThin. The company was founded in 1999 and is based in Southern California.

2017 – Glanbia invests in two new acquisitions: US-based Amazing Grass and Dutch company Body & Fit. Amazing Grass specializes in plant-based nutrition, "Greens," and superfood categories. Body & Fit is a direct-to-consumer distribution company focused on own-label and branded sports nutrition in the Benelux region.

October 2018 – Glanbia acquires the weight-management brand SlimFast and adds the ingredient manufacturer Watson to their portfolio.

2020: Glanbia completed the construction of a mozzarella plant in Ireland in partnership with Leprino Foods and a $470m cheese and whey protein manufacturing facility in Michigan. In the same year, Glanbia acquired Foodarom, a Canadian-based custom flavor designer and manufacturer, for $45 million (€38 million).

2021 – Glanbia acquires PacMoore, enhancing their healthy snack capability, and expands into e-sports by adding LevlUp to their brand portfolio.

2022 – Acquisition of Sterling Technology.

2023 – Acquisition of Flavor Producers for $355 million.

2025 – Acquisition of Sweetmix, a Brazil-based nutritional premix and ingredients solutions business. Acquisition of Scicore, an Indian nutritional manufacturer.

== Glanbia Ireland ==
On 18 May 2017, Glanbia Co-operative Society shareholders attended a Special General Meeting at the Punchestown Event Centre to vote on the creation of Glanbia Ireland, a joint venture between Glanbia Co-operative Society Limited (60%) and Glanbia plc (40%), combining Glanbia Consumer Products, Agribusiness, and Glanbia Ingredients Ireland. The proposal was approved by 93.1% of Glanbia Co-op shareholders. The creation of Glanbia Ireland was also approved by Glanbia plc's independent shareholders at an Extraordinary General Meeting (EGM) on 22 May 2017.

In April 2022, Glanbia plc announced that it had completed the sale of its 40% holding in Glanbia Ireland to Glanbia Co-operative Society Limited.

In September 2022, Glanbia Ireland changed its name to Tirlán Co-operative Society Limited.

== Segments ==
The company comprises:

- Glanbia Nutritionals
- Glanbia Performance Nutrition
- Joint Ventures

== Acquisition of Aroma Holding Company ==
In April 2024, Glanbia announced to acquire Aroma Holding Company, a US flavouring business for $300m (€281 million) plus deferred consideration of up to $55 million, dependent on performance in 2024. On 28 February 2024, the company also announced €100 million buyback programme which was unaffected by this agreement. Glanbia declared to operate Flavor Producers within its Glanbia Nutritionals.

== Sponsorship ==
In March 2023, Optimum Nutrition became the Official Performance Nutrition Partner of the Gaelic Players Association in a three-year partnership.

In September 2023, Glanbia became the lead sponsor of the Kilkenny Camogie Team. Glanbia will sponsor the county's senior, intermediate, minor and under-16 camogie teams over the next three years as part of the deal, with team jerseys and leisurewear carrying the Glanbia brand.

In February 2024, McLaren Racing announced Optimum Nutrition as the Official Sports Nutrition Partner of the team. Optimum Nutrition's branding will be prominently featured on the pit crew overalls and set-up kit, and the driver overalls.
