= Black-eyed pea (disambiguation) =

The black-eyed pea is a legume, a subspecies of the cowpea.

Black-eyed pea or peas may also refer to:

- Black-eyed Pea (restaurant), American casual dining restaurant chain specializing in Southern cuisine
- Black Eyed Peas, American hip-hop/dance pop music act
