= Milk Link =

Dairy company in the United Kingdom

Milk Link Ltd
- Type: Co-operative (Private Limited with share capital 04427868)
- Industry: Dairy
- Predecessor: Milk Marque (indirectly)
- Founded: 30 April 2000
- Defunct: 2012
- Fate: merger with Arla Foods
- Headquarters: 3120 Great Western Court, Hunts Ground Road, Stoke Gifford, Bristol, BS34 8HP
- Area served: UK
- Key people: Neil Kennedy; Chief Executive
- Products: Milk, cheese
- Revenue: £586 million (2010/11)
- Net income: £15.1 million
- Owner: British Farmers Community
- Divisions: Milk Link, Cheese; Milk Link, Milk
- Website: www.milklink.com

Milk Link was a large dairy company in the United Kingdom. It was the UK's largest dairy cooperative and the UK's largest producer of cheese. In 2012 the company merged with Arla Foods.

== History ==
It was formed in April 2000 as one of three successor co-operatives to Milk Marque. Milk Marque was broken up after the Competition Commission queried how it set milk prices.

In July 2002, the company bought the Crediton and Kirkcudbright creameries from Express Dairies for £33.1 million, both of which make UHT milk. It also bought out the 50% of joint-venture partner Express Dairies in the creamery at Frome. The Crediton operations were later sold in a management buyout.

In February 2004 it set up The Cheese Company with Kilkenny-based Glanbia, which had four cheese production sites and a packing facility supplying major retailers in the UK, in which it took a 75% stake. In December 2006 it bought out Glanbia for £47.2 million.

In July 2005 it closed a site at Sible Hedingham.

From October 2007 to February 2008 there were talks to merge with First Milk.

In August 2011 it split into two divisions named 'Milk Link, Cheese' and 'Milk Link, Milk'.

In September 2011 it announced that it would increase the size of the Lockerbie creamery by 50% to produce 37,000 tonnes of cheese a year, into a UK market which consumes 600,000 tonnes of cheese a year.

In 2012 the company merged with Arla Foods.

== Products ==
Each year it handles around 1.5 billion litres of milk.

It makes the chocolate-flavoured milk under licence for the Mars and Galaxy brand.

=== Cheeses ===
- Cheddar
- Stilton
- Cheshire
- Red Leicester
- Cheshire
- Double Gloucester
- Lancashire
- Wensleydale
- Caerphilly
- Cornish Brie
- Cornish Camembert
- Shropshire Blue

It exports cheese to 19 countries.

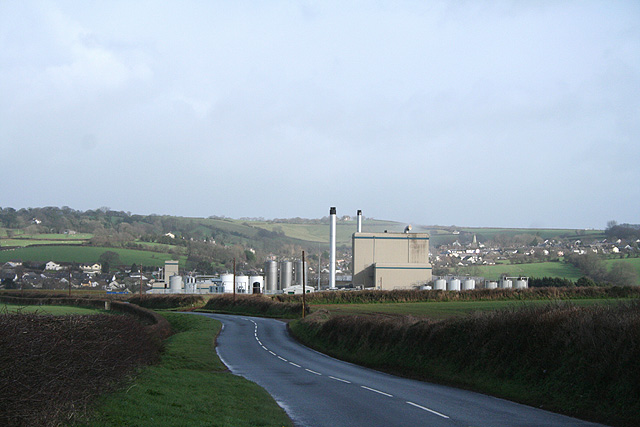
Taw Valley Creamery at North Tawton

== Structure ==
=== Creameries ===
- Crediton Dairy - sold April 2013 in a management buyout which trades as Crediton Dairy Limited.
- Kirkcudbright
- Llandyrnog, north Wales (Now mothballed)
- Lockerbie (cheddar cheese) - the largest dairy plant in Scotland, off the A709 near the River Annan
- Melton Mowbray
- Taw Valley Creamery
- Trevarrian

== See also ==
- First Milk, a Scottish dairy co-operative

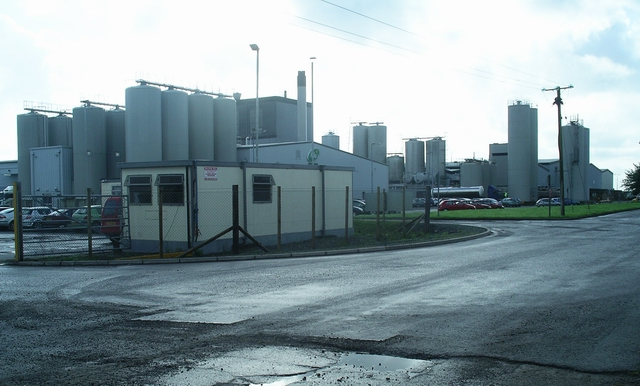
Lockerbie Creamery, formerly owned by The Cheese Company before 2007
