= First milk =

First milk can refer to:

- Colostrum - milk produced by the mammary glands of mammals (including humans) in late pregnancy
- First Milk (company) - UK dairy farming co-operative
