= Robert Wiseman =

- Born: 18 April 1916; United Kingdom
- Died: 7 December 2004 (aged 88); United Kingdom
- Occupation: Businessman

Robert Ramsey Wiseman (18 April 1916 – 7 December 2004) was a Scottish businessman and the founder of Robert Wiseman Dairies, one of the largest dairy businesses in the United Kingdom.

== Career ==
Born at Strathaven in Lanarkshire, Robert Wiseman sold his farmland to become a designated milk distributor in East Kilbride. He used his farm horse and cart to deliver milk.

== Personal life ==
Wiseman was married to Jean Wiseman, and together they had four sons and one daughter. Three of the sons became executives in the company.

His interests included bowling and curling.
