= Vitalite =

British brand of sunflower oil-based spread

- Formation: 1983

Vitalite is a sunflower oil–based spread, produced by Dairy Crest in Kirkby, Merseyside, England.

It began in 1983, being made by Kraft General Foods. In July 1996, it was bought by St Ivel, who were then bought by Dairy Crest in November 2002. In 2008, it was relaunched as a dairy-free spread, making it suitable for vegans.

== Advertising ==
A famous advertising campaign began in the United Kingdom during the 1980s, featured dancing sunflowers and a singing sun, with a parody of the song "Israelites" by Desmond Dekker. This campaign ran until 1994. One of several versions of the parody lyrics began:

"Wake up in the morning wantin' some breakfast. What sunflower spread do I lay on my bread? Ohhh, Ohhh, Vitalite."
