= PFSweb =

American provider of eCommerce services

PFSweb, Inc.

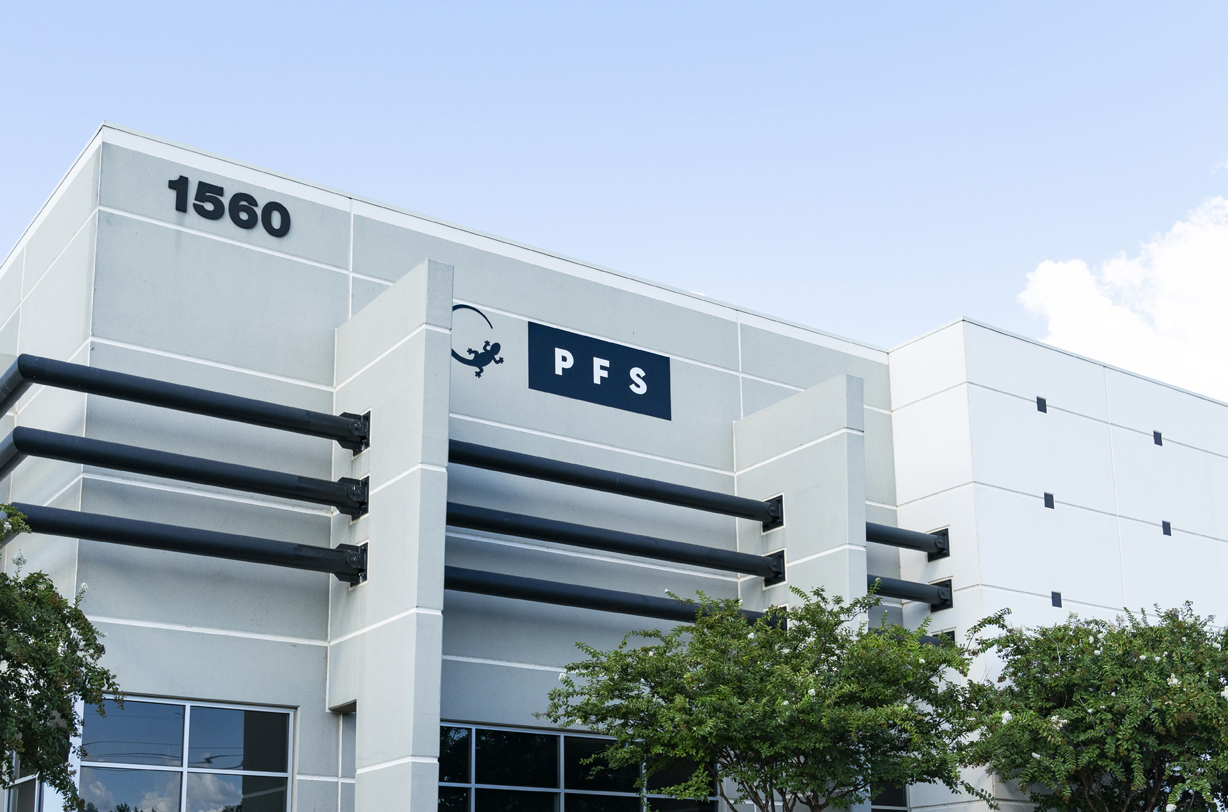
- PFSweb office
- Type: Subsidiary
- Traded as: Nasdaq: PFSW (1999-2023)
- Industry: eCommerce; Outsourcing; Fulfillment; Call Center; Third-party logistics (3PL)
- Founded: 1994; 32 years ago
- Founder: Mark C. Layton
- Headquarters: Irving, Texas, United States
- Number of locations: 12: (United States); (Canada); (England); (Belgium); (India)
- Area served: Worldwide: (North America); (Europe); (Asia)
- Key people: Zach Thomann
- Number of employees: 1100
- Parent: GXO Logistics
- Website: pfscommerce.com

PFSweb, Inc. (Priority Fulfillment Services) is an eCommerce fulfillment and logistics 3PL service provider for business-to-business and direct-to-consumer companies. Its corporate headquarters were relocated from Allen, Texas to Irving, Texas in 2022. As of 2023, the company had 2.2 million square feet of warehouse space, and distribution centers in the U.S., the UK, Belgium, and Canada.

== History ==
PFSweb, Inc. was founded in 1994 as Priority Fulfillment Services, Inc. (PFS) by Texas-based Daisytek International Corporation. The company first specialized in running call centers for clients and then expanded to provide electronic-commerce sales and order processing, product warehousing, packaging, and fulfillment services. The company formed a European division, PFSweb Europe, and 10 employees working at a call and fulfillment center in Maastricht, Netherlands, and expanded its operations to include a centralized European fulfillment center in Liège, Belgium.

In 1999, PFSweb was spun off from Daisytek as a separately operated, publicly traded company. Mark C. Layton, previously president and CEO of Daisytek, became chairman, president, and chief executive officer of PFSweb.

In February 2002, the company began offering customized manufacturing and supplier inventory services.

In 2006, PFSweb named Michael Willoughby as the President of the company. In February of that year, PFSweb completed the all-stock purchase of eCOST.com Inc. Under the merger, the online discount retailer became a subsidiary of PFSweb.

In early 2008, PFSweb formed a partnership with Demandware to expand its capabilities in the e-commerce technology market. PFSweb integrated the technology with its existing services, allowing it to enter into the marketplace of End-to-End (E2E) suppliers with its End2End eCommerce solution.

In February 2011, it was announced that PFSweb completed the sale of eCOST.com to PC Mall, Inc. for $2.3 million. In addition, PFSweb contracted with PC Mall to provide a variety of eCommerce services, including IT and customer care to eCOST.com operations on a temporary basis. Later that year, the company expanded its End-to-End eCommerce capabilities, launching a new solution through a partnership with Shopatron to create an omni-channel commerce solution.

In 2013, PFSweb announced a leadership change as Mike Willoughby replaced Mark Layton as CEO of the company. That year, PFSweb formed a relationship with the Japanese company transcosmos, Inc. (TCI). TCI bought a 20% stake in PFSweb, and PFSweb provided its services to TCI customers.

The company expanded internationally in 2015 by opening offices in Germany and the U.K. as well as expanding operations in Bangalore, India. In 2018, the company expanded its U.K. operation with a new logistics center.

In 2021, PFS sold the LiveArea agency to Merkle, a subsidiary of Japanese digital marketing company Dentsu, in 2020.

In October 2023, PFSweb was acquired by GXO Logistics for approximately $181 million.

== Services ==
PFSweb is a 3PL providing eCommerce fulfillment and logistics. Their primary services include distributed order orchestration systems, order processing, and shipping. They also provide customer care and contact center services, as well as fraud protection and payment processing.

== Acquisitions ==
- REV Solutions
- LiveAreaLabs
- Crossview
- MODA Superbe Limited
- Conexus Limited
