= United Dairies =

British dairy company

United Dairies was a United Kingdom-based creamery, milk bottling and distribution company. The company was formed in 1915 and merged to form Unigate in 1959.

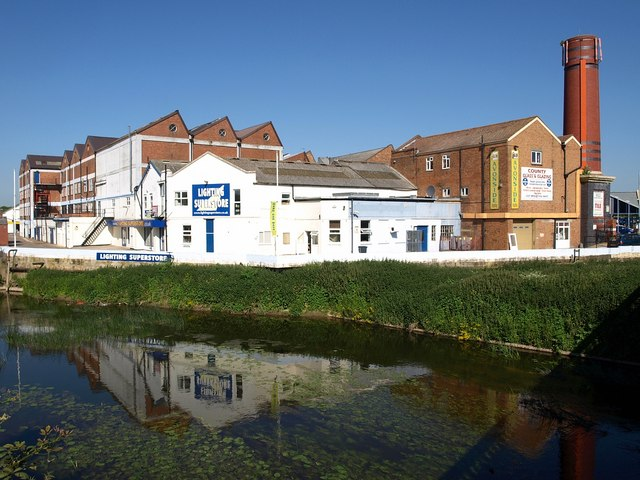
The former United Dairies creamery at Melksham in 2009; the chimney has been greatly reduced in height

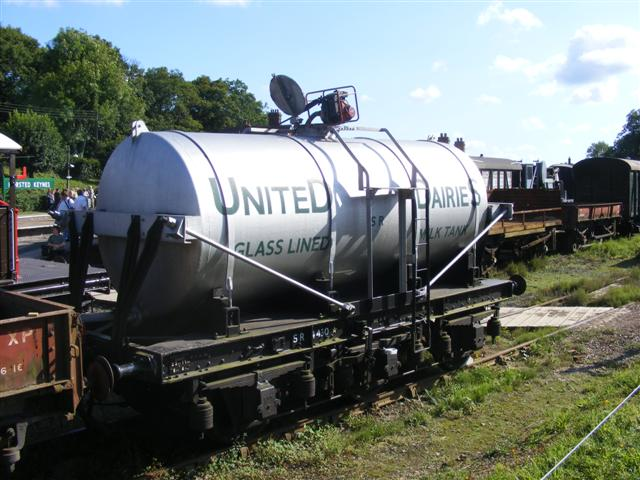
A United Dairies rail tanker, preserved at the Bluebell Railway

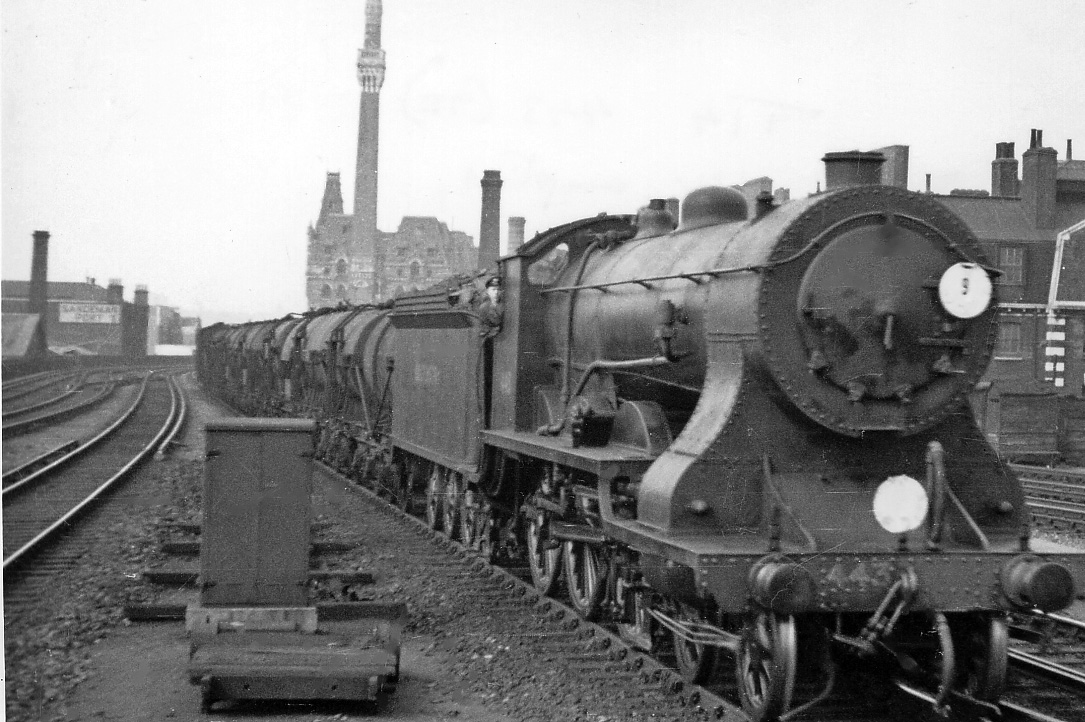
ex-LSW Drummond class T14 'Paddlebox' 4-6-0 No. 443 passing through Vauxhall having unloaded milk for the United Dairies depot at the same station, and then turned at Waterloo

During World War I, there were dire shortages of men, horses and vehicles commandeered for the war effort, hampering any business which was reliant on the timely distribution of its products, such as a dairy company. United Dairies was formed in 1915 when Wiltshire United Dairies (established in Melksham in 1897), Metropolitan and Great Western Dairies, and the Dairy Supply Company merged in an attempt to pool their resources and keep their companies operating until the end of the war. At first a wholesale business, in 1917 a large number of London retailers joined the company. The company had its headquarters at Trowbridge, Wiltshire.

So successful was the merger under chairman Sir Reginald Butler, that the company began to expand, buying other dairies and creameries across the United Kingdom. After the war ended, it bought businesses in Birmingham, Cheshire, Liverpool, Sherbourne (Warwickshire) and Wales.

In the late 1920s, United Dairies helped pioneer the sale of pasteurized milk in Britain. One of its largest factories, next to the River Avon at Melksham on the site of a former dye works, could handle up to 51,000 gallons of liquid milk per day in 1935; much of this was processed into cream or condensed milk, often for export. During World War II the company expanded into Scotland through acquisition.

The company was a large user of milk trains, and in agreement with the railway companies supplied its own distinctively coloured milk containers to top the railway companies' chassis. United Dairies operated milk trains with all four of the main railway companies. Its principal rail-served creameries were:

- Great Western Railway: Whitland, Carmarthen, Wootton Bassett, St Erth, Lostwithiel, Totnes, Moreton-in-Marsh, Wood Lane, Hemyock
- Southern Railway: Chard Junction, Semley, Salisbury, Vauxhall
- London, Midland and Scottish Railway: Calveley, Ecton, Uttoxeter, Willesden
- London North Eastern Railway: Ingestre, Egginton Junction, Finsbury Park, East Finchley, Halesworth, North Elmham, Ilford

By the early 1950s, United Dairies had become the UK's largest dairy products company. However, the company had become inefficient, and needed to improve its operations. After the 1958 retirement of Bramwell Gates, the chairman of its long-time rival Cow & Gate, its rival's new chairman Ernest Augustus Taylor began to negotiate a merger between the two companies. The union was completed in 1959, with the new listed company Unigate emerging.

The dairying side of Unigate's business was sold in 2000 to Dairy Crest.
