= GXO Logistics =

American contract logistics and warehousing company

GXO Logistics, Inc.
- Type: Public
- Traded as: NYSE: GXO; S&P 400 component
- Predecessor: XPO, Inc.
- Founded: August 2, 2021; 5 years ago
- Headquarters: Greenwich, Connecticut, U.S.
- Number of locations: 1,030 (2024)
- Key people: Brad Jacobs (non-executive chairman); Patrick Kelleher (CEO); Mark Suchinski (CFO)
- Revenue: ▲US$13.2 billion (2025)
- Net income: ▼US$32.0 million (2025)
- Number of employees: 152,000 (2024)
- Website: gxo.com

GXO Logistics, Inc. is an American multinational contract logistics company that manages outsourced supply chains and warehousing, and reverse logistics in over thirty countries. GXO's corporate headquarters are located in Greenwich, Connecticut, U.S.

== History ==
In December 2020, XPO, Inc. announced that it would spin off its global contract logistics segment into a separate company. In March 2021, XPO announced the new name of the firm as GXO Logistics Inc. The spin-off was completed on August 2, 2021, with American businessman Brad Jacobs named as Non-Executive Chairman, Malcolm Wilson as CEO; formerly the CEO of XPO, Inc. European division, and Baris Oran as CFO.

In May 2022, GXO announced the acquisition of the U.K.-based retail logistics company, Clipper Logistics. Clipper distributes goods for Marks & Spencer, Morrisons and Virgin Media O2 and specialises in life sciences, reverse logistics, and repairs. Reverse logistics are the movement of products from consumers back to retailers. The acquisition was completed in October after final regulatory approval. It expanded GXO’s presence into Germany and Poland, and added over 50 sites, 10 million square feet of warehouse space, and approximately 10,000 employees to the company.

That same month, as part of its European expansion, GXO also opened 30 shared warehouse facilities in the U.K. In May 2022, the company was named to the Fortune 500. At the end of the fourth quarter, it reported that e-commerce revenue had risen 31% and reverse logistics revenue 19%. By October 2022, GXO had opened 90 sites, signed 450 new customer contracts, and hired 15,000 people.

In April 2023, GXO announced a partnership with Sainsbury, the U.K. supermarket chain, to manage fresh and frozen shipments at several warehouse sites. In June 2023, the company signed a partnership agreement with Zalando for a new, automated fulfillment center in Montereau-sur-le-Jard, located near Paris, France. Also in June, GXO also announced a multiyear expansion program in Germany.

The company had around 1,000 warehouses in June 2023. In July 2023, GXO announced that Adrian Stoch was appointed to the new executive position of chief automation officer.

In October 2023, GXO acquired U.S.-based PFSweb, Inc., a tech-enabled eCommerce order fulfillment platform to expand its presence in North America.

In March 2024, GXO's takeover offer of Wincanton PLC worth £762 million was backed by its board of directors. The transaction was approved by the court on 25 April 2024, so allowing the take-over to be completed.

== Technology ==
By the end of 2022, the company had approximately 7,600 pieces of technology operational in customer sites. This included collaborative robots, vision scanners, automated guided vehicles (AGVs) and goods-to-person robots. In May 2023, GXO Direct announced that Blue Yonder was a new warehouse software partner.

== Operations ==
Following the split in August 2021 from XPO, Inc., GXO had approximately 94,000 employees and operated 869 warehouses with more than 208 million sq ft (19.3 million m^{2}) of facility space across 27 countries. GXO's contract logistics customers operate in technology and infrastructure. In 2023, GXO was the world’s largest contract logistics provider.

=== GXO Direct ===
GXO Direct is the shared services division of GXO Logistics. It was introduced in 2018 to provide an option for businesses who don't require an entire warehouse for their products. GXO Direct allows multiple customers to utilize one warehouse. It is operational in the U.S. and Canada. In March 2023, GXO Direct was expanded in the U.K.

== See also ==
- Economy of Connecticut
- Fortune 500 Companies
