= Wincanton plc =

British logistics company

- Type: Subsidiary
- Traded as: LSE: WIN
- Industry: Logistics
- Founded: 1925; 101 years ago
- Headquarters: Chippenham, England
- Key people: Sir Martin Read (chairman); James Wroath (CEO)
- Products: Logistics; Supply chain management
- Revenue: ▲£1,462 million (2023)
- Operating income: ▲£70.8 million (2023)
- Net income: ▼£33.2 million (2023)
- Number of employees: 20,005 (2023)
- Parent: GXO Logistics (2024–present)
- Website: www.wincanton.co.uk

Wincanton plc is a British provider of logistics with its origins in milk haulage. The company provides transport and logistics services including specialist automated high bay, high capacity warehouses, and supply chain management for businesses. The company was listed on the London Stock Exchange until it was acquired by GXO Logistics in April 2024.

== History ==
Wincanton was founded in 1925, as Wincanton Transport & Engineering Ltd, a subsidiary of the West Surrey Central Dairy Company, a company which has since been known as Cow & Gate, Unigate and then Uniq.

In the 1970s, Wincanton diversified into new market sectors including petroleum and developed temperature controlled operations for the transportation of food stuffs and refrigerated goods. In the 1990s, Wincanton merged with Unigate Chilled Distribution, and entered the retail market, through the acquisition of Glass Glover in February 1993. In March 2001, Wincanton plc demerged from Uniq, and was listed on the London Stock Exchange.

In November 2008, Wincanton acquired the CEL Group. In March 2011, Wincanton partnered with Serco to provide prisoner escort services in England. In November 2015, Wincanton sold its records management business (WRM) to Restore to reduce its average net indebtedness, and allow room for growth. In February 2016, Wincanton partnered with Magnet Kitchens to produce 44 new double-decker articulated trailers which was an investment of £2 million.

In March 2016, Wincanton launched EnergyLink, a network based in the United Kingdom to support greater flexibility in delivery services for the energy sector.

In April 2016, Wincanton gained further growth of its operations at the Port of Southampton after moving to a new base and investing in new equipment, supported by extra rail capacity.

In June 2016, Wincanton renewed its distribution deal with Sainsbury's for an additional five years.

In July 2016, Wincanton renewed a contract with The Co-operative Group for a further five years, which brings the contract to 25 years. As part of the agreement, around 700 staff of Wincanton and a fleet of more than 500 vehicles will support the Co-op, by making around 130,000 journeys each year to as many as 1,000 stores of the Co-op across the United Kingdom.

In October 2019, Wincanton plc expressed an interest in merging with Eddie Stobart. Wincanton, later withdrew their offer, saying that it had "yet to receive full disclosure of the information requested to enable it to complete its due diligence exercise".

In January 2024, a takeover offer from CMA CGM worth £718 million was recommended for acceptance by Wincanton's board of directors. Then, in March 2024, the board of directors decided to back a higher offer worth £762 million from GXO Logistics. Completion of the takeover was approved by the court on 25 April 2024 but was subject to an investigation by the Competition and Markets Authority from 26 April 2024. The deal was cleared in June 2025, after which CEO James Wroath left to become CEO of Keller Group from August 2025.

== Headquarters ==
The company's origins are in Wincanton, Somerset, although the head office is now based in Methuen Park, Chippenham, Wiltshire.

== Operations ==
Wincanton currently directly employs in the region of 20,000 people across the United Kingdom and Ireland through a network of 160 sites.
