= Frijj =

Brand of milkshake

- Type: Milkshake
- Manufacturer: Müller Milk & Ingredients
- Origin: United Kingdom
- Introduced: 1993
- Flavour: Various
- Website: www.muller.co.uk

Frijj (stylised as FRijj) is a brand of milkshake sold mainly in the United Kingdom. Today it is produced by Müller. It was first launched in 1993 by Dairy Crest. Frijj is sold in five permanent flavours: strawberry, chocolate, banana, fudge brownie and cookie dough.

== History ==
It was developed at the Dairy Crest development centre at the Crudgington creamery in Shropshire in 1991, which opened in 1974.

== Limited editions ==
There have also been numerous limited edition flavours. Since July 2003, some have featured characters from The Simpsons, in marketing campaigns. Other limited edition flavours include custard, caramel, raspberry doughnut, Jaffa Cake, banoffee pie, vanilla, white chocolate, chocolate mint, cookies and cream and Irish coffee.

A thicker version of Frijj was launched in 1998 called 'Frijj Extreme', available in two flavours – white chocolate and milk chocolate. Since 27 December 2015, Frijj has been produced by Müller Milk & Ingredients following the sale by Dairy Crest of their milk business to Müller.

== Sizes ==
As of 2023, Frijj is sold in 330ml bottles. Originally sold in 500ml bottles this was reduced to 471ml then 400ml. It is also available in 950ml bottle sizes. 330ml bottles for all flavours but 950ml bottles are only available in strawberry, Chocolate fudge brownie and cookie dough flavour currently.

== Flavours ==
Flavour	Special	Availability	Note(s)
Chocolate		1993–	Also available in Grab & Go bottles
Strawberry		1993–	Also available in Grab & Go bottles
Banana		1998–	
Chilla Vanilla		July 1999–	
Mount Caramel		November 2000–	
Chocolate Fudge Brownie		2003–	Also available in Grab & Go bottles
Raspberry		2006–February 2007	
Toffee Caramel		March–September 2007	
Chocolate Orange		September 2007–October 2008	
Chocolate Mint		May 2008–?	
Vanillaaaaarghh		July 2008–July 2009	
Cookie Dough		April 2009–April 2010 / September 2013–	
Caramel Cheer	For the 2010 FIFA World Cup	April–August 2010	
Cookies & Cream	Limited Edition	July 2010–April 2012	
Raspberry Jam Doughnut	"The Incredible" Range	August 2011–November 2012	Formerly known as the "Circus" range
Honeycomb Choc Swirl	"The Incredible" Range	August 2011–	Formerly known as the "Circus" range
Sticky Toffee Pudding	"The Incredible" Range	August 2011–	Formerly known as the "Circus" range
Creamy Banoffee Pie	"The Incredible" Range	August 2011–	Formerly known as the "Circus" range
Caramel Latte	"The Incredible" Range	May 2013–	Not part of the "Circus" range
Vanilla	Limited Edition	September 2011 – 2014	
Honeycomb Choc Swirl	Supreme Range	April 2015–	Re branded from the "Circus" range.
White Choc Raspberry Swirl	Supreme Range	April 2015–April 2016	
Milky Surprise	Supreme Range	April 2015-May 2018	Re branded from the "KL" collection
Sticky Toffee Pudding	Supreme Range	April 2015–	
Strawberry Cheesecake	Supreme Range	May 2016–	
Loaded Choc Orange	Limited Edition	May 2016–	
MmmMango & Passion Fruit	40% Less Sugar	May 2016–	
Choco-Hazelnut		March 2017–	
White Choco & Pistachio	Limited Edition	July 2017–	
Irish Coffee	Limited Edition	October 2017–	
After Dinner Chocolate Mint	Limited Edition	February 2019-	
Chocolate Banana	Limited Edition	August 2019-	
Brookies & Cream		November 2025-	
Salted Caramel Frappe	Limited Edition	March 2026-	
Chilli Chocolate	Limited Edition	September 2026- November 2026	
Sweet Salty Popcorn	Limited Edition	2026-	

== Sponsorship and campaigns ==
Frijj is well known for its high-profile sponsorship campaigns, the most famous of which was the association with television show Big Brother, the sponsorship lasted for one series during 2003. Around the same time, Frijj was the main sponsor of ill-fated dating show Elimidate hosted by ex Atomic Kitten singer Kerry Katona; the sponsorship of the show ceased at the end of its run in 2003.

July 2008 marked the introduction of a new advertising campaign for Frijj, the first since 2005. This included a series of five viral videos produced by the advertising agency Grey London, which parodied 1950s horror film The Blob. Further to this, a number of adverts ran on the sides of buses and a limited edition bottle design was produced.

In August 2009, it was revealed that Frijj were going to be the new sponsors of Soccer AM, a weekly football based programme produced by British Sky Broadcasting, after signing a £2 million sponsorship deal. Frijj also sponsor Morden & District Sunday Football League team Epsom Downs FC.

The 2011 "circus" flavours each had their own animal mascot appearing on the packaging; Magnus Monkee (monkey), Pablo Pooch (dog), Hugo Meeow (tiger), The Great Lazaro (rabbit) and Captain Roary (lion), animals commonly found in traditional circuses, to fit in with that range's theme.

=== Thorpe Park promotion ===
In 2012, Frijj ran an on-pack promotional campaign linked to Thorpe Park, with special packaging featuring the theme park branding.
