= Clover (spread) =

Brand of margarine

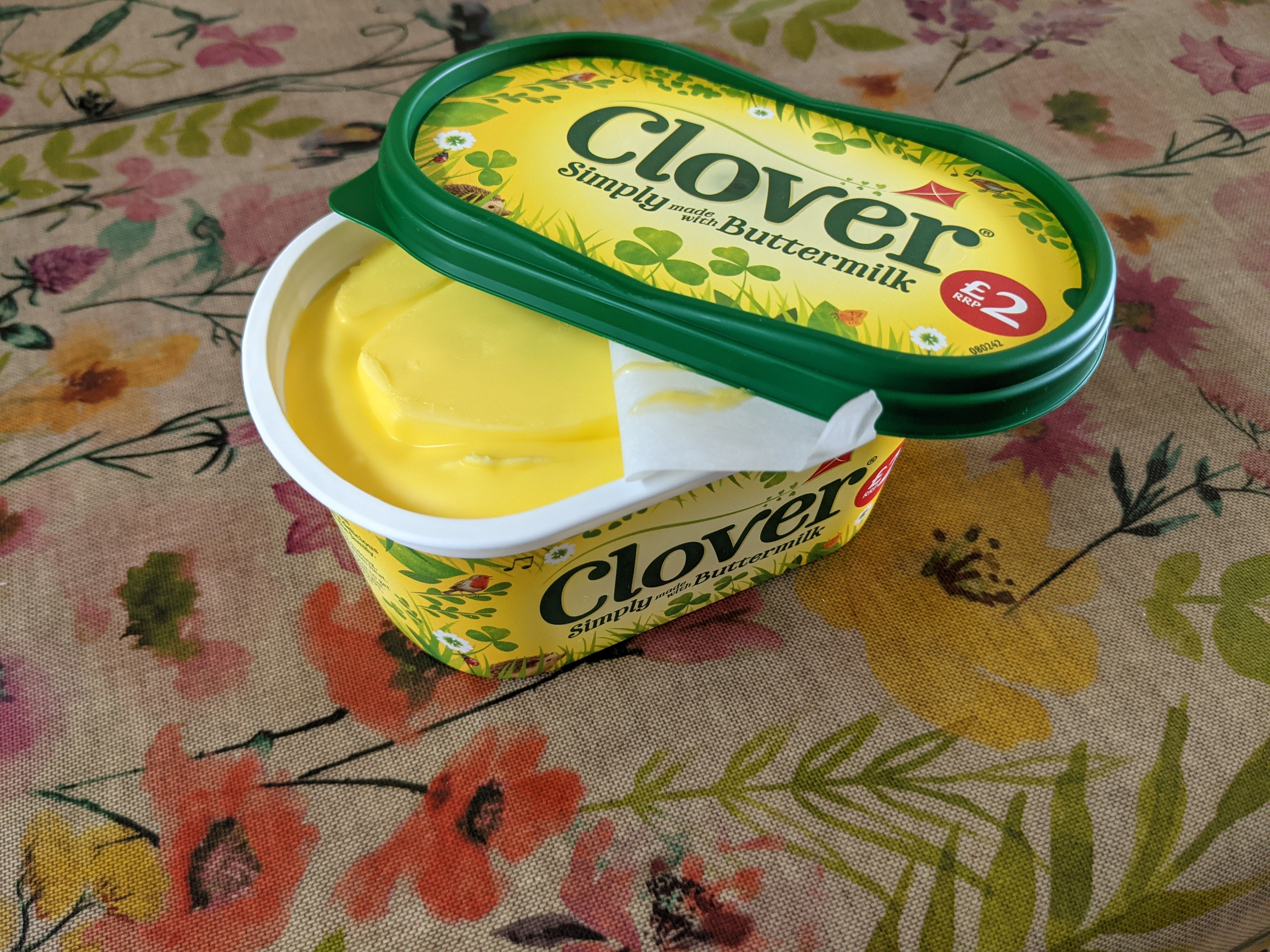
- Clover spread (British Packaging)
- Type: Spread
- Place of origin: United Kingdom
- Created by: Dairy Crest
- Invented: 1983
- Main ingredients: Vegetable fat, buttermilk

Clover is a brand of soft spread sold in the United Kingdom that is produced by Saputo Dairy UK. It resembles butter but is easier to spread when cold. Its ingredients include vegetable fat and buttermilk. The brand was launched in September 1983 and is claimed to be worth £81m at retail value. It is made in Kirkby near Liverpool, England.
