= Clipper Logistics =

England-based retail logistics company

Clipper Logistics plc
- Type: Subsidiary
- Industry: Logistics
- Founded: 1992
- Founder: Steve Parkin
- Defunct: 2022
- Fate: Acquired by GXO Logistics in 2022
- Successor: GXO Logistics
- Headquarters: Holbeck, Leeds, UK
- Area served: Europe
- Key people: Steve Parkin (executive chairman); Tony Mannix (chief executive officer); David Hodkin (chief financial officer)
- Revenue: ▲£696.2 million (2021)
- Operating income: ▲£39.8 million (2021)
- Net income: ▲£21.7 million (2021)
- Number of employees: 9,148 (2021)
- Subsidiaries: Servicecare Support Services Limited; RepairTech Limited; Northern Commercials (Mirfield) Limited; Stormont Truck and Van Limited
- Website: clippergroup.co.uk

Clipper Logistics plc was a British retail logistics company which served retailers selling fashion, tobacco, alcohol and other high-value goods in the UK and Europe. It operated 47 sites across Europe and was based in Leeds. The company was listed on the London Stock Exchange until it was acquired by GXO Logistics in May 2022.

== History ==
=== Early history ===
Steve Parkin founded Clipper Group in 1992 with one van delivering clothing for fashion stores. The company won a number of contracts in the early years with retailers such as Huddersfield-based Bonmarché and Sir Philip Green which helped it to become established in the transport, haulage and warehousing market. The company made a number of acquisitions in the 2000s including DTS logistics Ltd, Gagewell Transport Ltd and Northern Commercials (Mirfield) Ltd In 2014 the company was floated on the London Stock Exchange with a valuation of £100 million.

=== Takeover Attempt ===
In November 2019, investment fund Sun Capital Partners, Inc. announced it was considering making a bid for the company, supported by founder and executive chairman Steve Parkin. Discussions regarding a possible offer took place between the parties, and the views of a number of independent Clipper shareholders were sought. However, the board and Sun Capital were unable to agree on terms, consequently, both sides agreed to terminate discussions.

=== Coronavirus pandemic support ===
In March 2020, the company was given a contract by the NHS Supply Chain for the delivery of personal protective equipment to NHS trusts and care homes. This was considered to be controversial amid a scandal over the appointment of COVID-19 contracts in the United Kingdom and alleged cronyism in the British government, as Parkin is a top Conservative Party donor who has attended Leader's Group meetings ("the premier supporter Group of the Conservative Party") and donated £725,000 to the Conservative Party. The company reported a 38.2 percent rise in interim pre-tax profits aided by "a successful Black Friday weekend" and was helped by a "significant increase in supporting Supply Chain Co-ordination (NHS) with the storage and distribution of PPE", processing "over 7.4 billion items of PPE on the NHS contract".

=== Charity ===
In May 2020, the company donated a refrigerated trailer to the food bank run by Leeds United Foundation and Leeds City Council.

=== Takeover ===
On 28 February 2022 GXO Logistics made a recommended offer for the company. In May 2022, it was announced the acquisition had been completed. According to GXO this will vastly increase the scope of its reverse logistics services, and provide a bridgehead into Germany. Clipper has been strong in repairs and returns logistics, especially in consumer electronics, and repaired around 1.5 million items during the year ended 30 April 2022.

== Operations ==
It operated a distribution centre for Superdry in Burton-upon-Trent which was equipped with 46 Hikrobots, 1,000 transportable pick-wall modules and twelve pick-to-light stations. In 2016, Clipper and John Lewis Partnership formed a joint venture to provide click and collect services to high-street retailers.

In June 2020, it was announced that clipper would be taking over the logistics operation for Arcadia Group from DHL.

== Corporate Affairs ==
=== Financials ===
Companies Finances
Year	Revenue (£m)	Operating Income (£m)	Net Profit (£m)
2016	290.33	14.53	10.34
2017	340.13	17.47	12.47
2018	400.12	20.83	14.28
2019	460.17	19.48	13.41
2020	500.67	31.43	16.19
2021	696.20	39.77	21.66

== Controversies ==
Staff at the company warehouse in Ollerton, Nottinghamshire complained in March 2020 that they were "crammed into corridors" and given no hand sanitiser.

== Sponsorship ==
Clipper was a sponsor of Leeds United football club until its acquistion by GXO.
