= Saputo Dairy UK =

British dairy products company

- Formerly: Dairy Crest plc
- Type: Limited Company
- Industry: Dairy Products
- Founded: 1981; 45 years ago
- Headquarters: Weybridge, Surrey, United Kingdom
- Key people: Steve Douglas (COO)
- Products: Cathedral City (cheese); Clover; Petits Filous
- Revenue: £456.8 million (2018)
- Operating income: £71.4 million (2018)
- Net income: £149.5 million (2018)
- Owner: Saputo Inc.
- Number of employees: 1,097 (2018)
- Website: uk.saputo.com

Saputo Dairy UK, also Dairy Crest Limited, is a British dairy products company. It was created in 2019 when the Canadian company Saputo Inc bought the Dairy Crest company, which had been created in 1981 as a spin-off of the Milk Marketing Board. Its brands include Cathedral City Cheddar cheese, Country Life butter, Utterly Butterly, Vitalite, Wensleydale and Clover.

Dairy Crest processed and sold milk (wholesale and via doorstep deliveries) and owned the milkshake brand Frijj until the sale of that part of the business to Germany's Müller in 2015. The company was listed on the London Stock Exchange (LSE) as Dairy Crest plc, until it was acquired by Saputo in 2019. Saputo rebranded the company under its own name later that year.

== History ==
Dairy Crest was established in 1981 as the milk processing arm of the Milk Marketing Board. In 1983, the company launched Clover, a dairy spread. The company established a joint venture with French dairy company Yoplait in 1981, called Yoplait Dairy Crest. YDC is 51% owned by Yoplait and 49% by Dairy Crest, and distributes Yoplait brand products in the UK.

In 1995, Dairy Crest bought the Cathedral City brand of cheese from Mendip Foods Ltd. The business was privatised the following year and Dairy Crest was listed on the London Stock Exchange.

Logo of Dairy Crest

In 2000, Dairy Crest acquired the dairy and cheese products division of Unigate in London, and in 2002 bought the St Ivel spreads company, which had been based in Wootton Bassett in Wiltshire. It acquired the Country Life butter brand from the English Butter Marketing Company in 2004, and Express Dairies from Arla Foods in 2006 for £33 million.

The company sold the majority of its own-label cheese business to its Scottish equivalent First Milk in 2006, along with the creameries and factory that produced most of the products concerned. In 2007, Dairy Crest bought St Hubert for £248 million, securing the Cholegram, Le Fleurier, Omega 3 and Vallé brands, which were subsequently sold in 2012 to Montagu Private Equity for €430 million (£347 million).

Plans for the Crudgington Creamery to close were announced in 2012. The creamery closed in May 2014, when production of spreads was concentrated at Kirkby on Merseyside while the research and development facility was transferred to an innovation centre built by the company at Harper Adams University, Shropshire

=== Sale of milk business ===
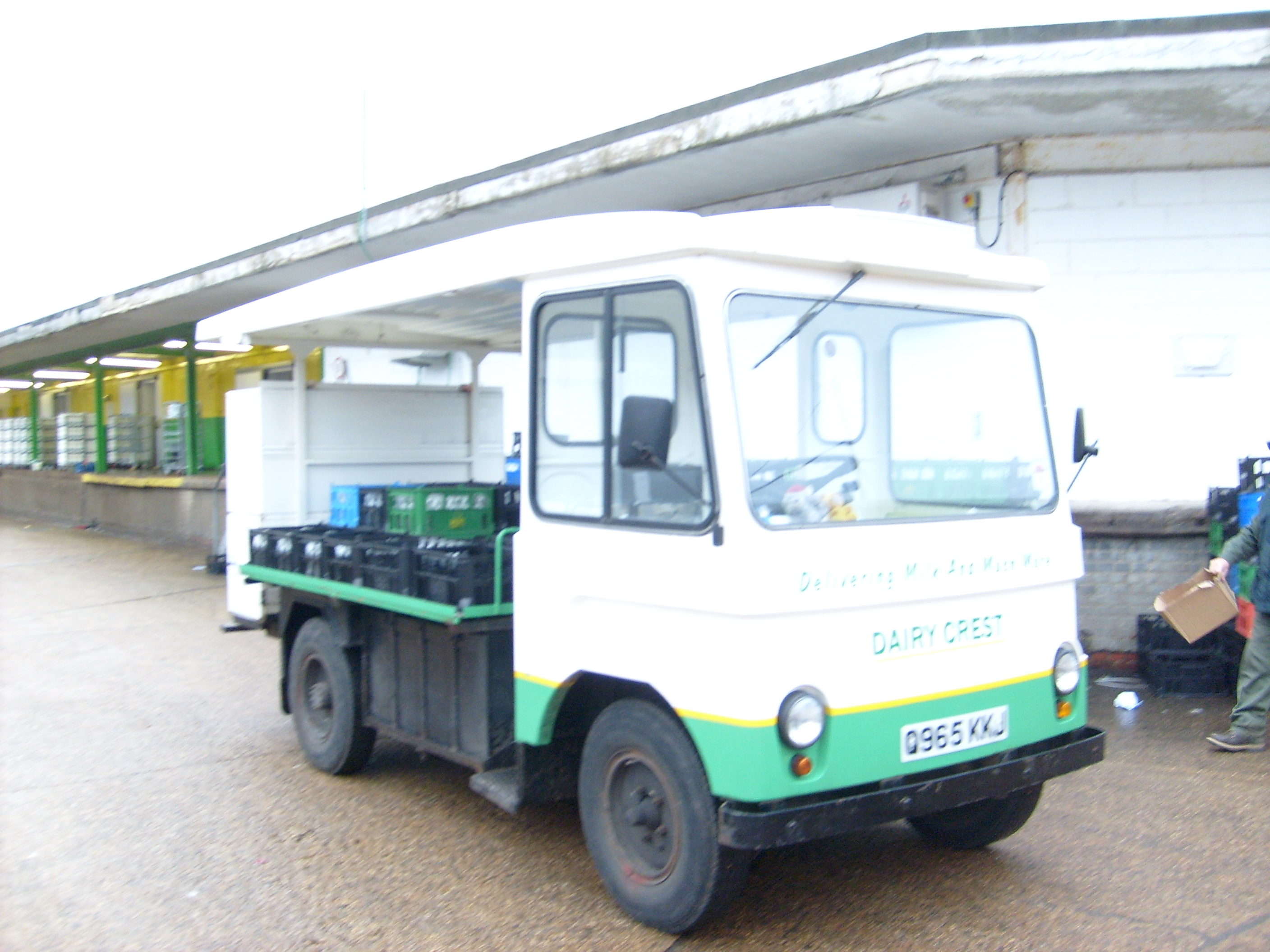
A Dairy Crest Smith's Elizabethan milk float in 2008

Dairy Crest sold its doorstep milk delivery operations in the North West of England in July 2013 to Creamline Dairies who now operate the milk rounds from the depots in Warrington, Flixton, Stockport and Macclesfield, while Mortons operate rounds in Wirral, Chester and Liverpool. Dairy Crest announced a drop in profits on 6 November 2014, down 95% to £900,000 in the six months to September.

The company agreed the sale of its entire legacy milk business, which processes and distributes milk, as well as the Frijj milkshake brand, to Germany's Müller for £80 million, enabling it to be combined with Müller's existing subsidiary, Müller Wiseman Dairies. The sale was approved by the Competition and Markets Authority on 19 October 2015, and completed the following December.

=== Acquisition by Saputo ===
It was announced in 2019 that Canadian dairy company Saputo Inc would be buying Dairy Crest. The company was valued at £975 million, making each share worth 620p. The transaction was completed on 15 April 2019. At the time of the sale, Dairy Crest was the fourth largest dairy company in the UK based on turnover. Saputo renamed the business under its own brand in July 2019, though Dairy Crest Limited remained the principal legal entity.

In 2021, Saputo purchased Bute Island Foods, the manufacturer of Sheese vegan cheese.

The company supplies cheese, spreads and drinks. Cheese brands include Cathedral City, Davidstow Cheddar and Wexford. Spread brands include Clover, Country Life, Utterly Butterly, Vitalite and Willow. Spread and Frylight cooking spray production is consolidated at Kirkby. Davidstow Creamery in Cornwall has been run by the company since 1981.

== Pollution ==
At Truro Crown Court in December 2021, Dairy Crest admitted charges relating to a series of incidents of serious pollution between December 2015 and January 2021, including the illegal discharge of "biological sludge" and "suspended solids" from its creamery at Davidstow into the River Inny, Cornwall. Fines of £1.52 million and costs of £272,747 were imposed on the company in June 2022. It was reported that there was a possibility that the company's royal warrant could be removed as a result of the pollution.

Pollution in 2023 and 2025 in a tributary of the River Ure was caused by a faulty drainage system at its Wensleydale Creamery in Hawes, North Yorkshire.

In 2025 the company said it was making the switch from producing demineralised whey and galacto-oligosaccharides, which it began producing in 2013, in order to return to the production of sweet whey powder.

The Environment Agency cited the Davidstow site as a persistently poorly performing site in the 2024–25 Chief Regulator’s report. In 2026, the Environment Agency initiated a consultation process for a new permit at the Davidstow creamery, which aims to introduce environmental improvements and allow an increase in cheese production.
