= First Milk (co-operative) =

British dairy co-operative

First Milk Limited
- Company type: Co-operative
- Industry: Dairy
- Predecessors: Scottish Milk Ltd and Axis Milk Ltd
- Founded: 2001; 25 years ago
- Headquarters: Glasgow, Scotland
- Area served: United Kingdom
- Key people: Chris Thomas (Chairperson); Shelagh Hanock (Chief Executive)
- Products: Dairy products
- Revenue: £570m (2025)
- Members: 699 (2025)
- Number of employees: 466 (2025)
- Website: firstmilk.co.uk

First Milk Limited is a British dairy co-operative which manufactures cheese, specialist dairy ingredients and whey proteins for its customers, as well as providing traceable fresh milk to a range of dairy manufacturers and food processors. As a dairy co-operative, owned and run by farmers; the area covered by its milk pool runs from the Mull of Kintyre in Scotland down through England and Wales.

The co-operative operates the largest regenerative farming programme in the UK dairy industry in a commitment to building the sustainability of British dairy and taking a holistic approach to food production. First Milk was awarded B Corp certification in 2022, as well as being awarded the King's Enterprise Award for Sustainable Development in recognition of its contribution and commitment to sustainable practices.

== History ==
=== Formation of First Milk 1994–2001 ===
In 1994 the Milk Marketing Boards were abolished following the deregulation of the dairy market. A number of organisations were formed as a result, including Scottish Milk Ltd and Milk Marque.

In 1997 Scottish Milk Ltd acquired the Isle of Bute, Campbeltown and Arran Creameries and the Mauchline cheese packing plant.

In 1999 Milk Marque was broken up and as a result Axis Milk Ltd was formed.

In 2001 Scottish Milk Ltd and Axis Milk Ltd merged to form First Milk Limited, which was the largest dairy co-operative at that time.

=== Acquisitions and Consolidation 2002–2019 ===
In 2002 First Milk acquired a 20% stake in its current Haverfordwest Creamery in Wales, a part of a joint venture with Dairy Crest.

2003 saw the co-operative enter into a joint venture to buy Westbury Dairies Ltd with Dairy Farmers of Britain and Milk Link. The following year the co-operative also acquired a 15% share in Robert Wiseman Dairies Plc.

In 2006 First Milk Cheese Company purchased the Haverfordwest and Lake District sites, as well as a packaging and ingredients plant at Maelor.

In 2010 First Milk closed its Rothesay creamery on the Isle of Bute, and also entered into a joint venture to operate the Westbury plant with Arla and Milk Link that same year.

2011 saw First Milk purchase Kingdom Cheese Dairy Companies, as well as enter a joint venture with Fonterra to produce whey protein concentrate at its Lake District Creamery.

In 2012 First Milk purchased CNP Professional Ltd – which manufactured Premium Sports Nutrition products.

In 2014 First Milk agreed a strategic and long-term partnership with Adams Foods (now Ornua) to provide hard cheese for sale in retail within the UK.

The following year the co-operative divested from soft cheese production, selling the business to Grahams the Family Dairy.

In 2016 the co-operative concluded its joint venture with Arla at its Westbury creamery, and sold CNP Professional Ltd.

In 2019 First Milk and Fonterra decide to end their joint venture to produce whey protein, with First Milk taking over 100% of the venture.

That same year First Milk closed its Arran and Campbeltown creameries.

=== Strategic Shift to Regenerative Principles 2020–Present ===
In 2020 First Milk acquired Lake District Biogas – a site which produces renewable biogas from by-products from the cheese and whey manufacturing process.

In 2021, as part of the co-operative's renewed focus on sustainability and environmental improvement, First Milk invested in Agricarbon; an organisation which measures the carbon content of soil.

In 2022 the co-operative was successfully certified as a B Corp as a result of its sustainability and regenerative programme of work.

In 2023, the co-operative was one of the first winners of the King's Award for Enterprise for Sustainable Development, in recognition of its sustainability targets and regenerative production methods.

During 2023 the co-operative also undertook a corporate rebranding programme, to better reflect its renewed focus on regenerative agriculture and sustainability.

In 2024, the co-operative acquired BV Dairy, a specialist fresh dairy processing business based in Shaftesbury in Dorset. This business serves the food manufacturing and food service sector, and this extended First Milk’s range of dairy products into soft cheese, yoghurts, clotted cream, mascarpone and cultured creams.

== Sustainability ==
The co-operative has around 700 farmer members, who have an average herd size of 173 cows and on average farm 177 hectares. Around 91% of First Milk farms are run on grazing-based systems – meaning cows must be grazed for a minimum of six months.

A core tenet of First Milk's strategic ethos and mission is its commitment to sustainability and environmental responsibility. The dairy co-operative implemented a regenerative farming programme in 2021, which became integrated as part of its updated brand positioning in 2023. First Milk farmers almost exclusively adhere to the principles of regenerative agriculture: protecting the soil surface, maintaining living roots, encouraging plant diversity, minimising soil disturbance and livestock integration.

First Milk has publicly committed to reaching net zero by 2040, with interim commitments to sequestering 100,000 tonnes of CO_{2}e per year on farms by 2025, reducing carbon footprint at farm level by 50% by 2030 and achieving net zero in milk processing and transport by 2035.

The co-operative also considers the economic and social aspects of dairy farming and encompasses those within its sustainability mission.

== Operations ==
First Milk has two cheese creameries within Great Britain, one located at Haverfordwest in Wales and one in Aspatria, within the Lake District in Cumbria. In addition, in 2024 First Milk acquired BV Dairy in Shaftesbury, Dorset – a specialist fresh dairy ingredients business. First Milk also own and operate Lake District Biogas, located adjacent to the processing plant in Aspatria. Lake District Biogas operates an aerobic digester, which produces renewable biogas using by-products from dairy processing and sells renewable energy into the grid. This delivers a net carbon benefit of around 4,000 tonnes a year.

First Milk produces around 80,000 tonnes of cheese each year. Due to a number of capital investments at each creamery, processing capacity within the co-operative has steadily increased since 2019.

== Products and Partnerships ==
First Milk produces a range of award-winning cheeses, producing varieties of aged and coloured cheddars, Red Leicester and Double Gloucester. In 2023, the co-operative was awarded Supreme Champion at the annual International Cheese and Dairy Awards for its Double Gloucester recipe, making it the first block cheese to pick up this title in over 20 years.

The co-operative trades predominantly on a business-to-business (B2B) basis, selling the range of cheese and dairy products it produces on to other dairy customers for onward sale or export. Prominent customers include Ornua and Nestle.

First Milk also produces whey proteins as a by-product of the cheese-making process. These products are used within food manufacturing and for specialist animal nutrition.

First Milk also operates a direct-to-consumer brand: Golden Hooves, first launched in 2022. The brand operates farm vending machine franchises in collaboration with farmer members, and also sells regenerative cheddar cheese direct to consumers via farm and deli shops, as well as via online cheese stockists.
