= St Ivel =

United Kingdom brand of dairy products

St.Ivel logo (1992)

St Ivel is a brand of dairy products in the United Kingdom, introduced in 1901 by the Yeovil-based dairy company Aplin & Barrett, for use on a range of their products. The company was taken over by Unigate Dairy Company in 1960. Most production sites were in the south west of England and some in Wales. Most of its brands were bought in the beginning of the 2000s by Dairy Crest, following a severe decline in doorstep deliveries of milk – previously a major area of business for Unigate. In 2020 the St Ivel brand was still used for buttermilk produced by Dairy Crest's successor Müller.

== Products and divisions ==
=== Low fat spreads ===
The spreads division, which included the Gold low fat brand, manufactured in Kirkby on Merseyside, were bought by Dairy Crest in November 2002 for £86m from Uniq. Uniq had been formed from what was left of Unigate after selling its cream division to Dairy Crest in May 2000. When the spreads division had gone as well, Uniq and the former Unigate were barely recognisable.

=== Cream ===
The cream division was bought by Dairy Crest from Unigate/Uniq in July 2000.

=== Yoghurts ===
St Ivel, being owned by Uniq/Unigate, made Shape yoghurts in Wootton Bassett in Wiltshire, until this brand was sold off to Danone for £32m. The factory closed in February 2003, having opened in 1908, and is now the Beaufort Park housing estate after being sold for £19m in August 2004. The factory was demolished in June 2005.

=== Milk ===
Under the St Ivel name, Dairy Crest makes milk promoted to school age children with added Omega 3 fatty acids. Robert Wiseman Dairies of Scotland tried unsuccessfully to buy the milk division of Unigate in March 2000. St Ivel also supply milk to Marks and Spencer.

=== Juice ===
St Ivel manufactures Mr Juicy. This can be purchased in a range of flavours, however, the most common one is orange.

== Production sites ==
St Ivel had other sites in Chichester, Evercreech, Whitchurch, Westbury, Hemyock, Harby, Chard, Minsterley in Shropshire, and St Erth in Cornwall. Cheese was made in Haverfordwest, Carmarthen. The site in Cornwall specialised in Cornish clotted cream and desserts made with clotted cream, including rice pudding. It also produced cheesecakes for Marks & Spencer.

== In popular culture ==
An episode of The Benny Hill Show parodied St Ivel in a spoof commercial for "St Evil." The name, set against a grassy lawn in large white letters, were moved around first to spell "VILEST," ending with a letter R being dragged in from off-camera to spell "LIVER."
