= Milk Marque =

British dairy industry co-operative

Milk Marque logo

Milk Marque was a British dairy industry co-operative that was the successor to the Milk Marketing Board. At one point, Milk Marque controlled over half of the UK market for raw milk.

In 2000, Milk Marque's activities were split into three separate regional successor companies following a report by the Monopolies and Mergers Commission. The three successor companies were Axis, Zenith Milk, and Milk Link.

Milk Marque continued as a corporate entity subsequent to the break-up, becoming a private limited company.
