= Cathedral City Cheddar =

Brand of Cheddar cheese

Cathedral City
- Type: Cheddar cheese
- Manufacturer: Saputo Dairy UK
- Available: Yes
- Current supplier: Saputo Dairy UK
- Slogan: "The Nation's Favourite"
- Website: cathedralcity.co.uk

Cathedral City is a British brand of Cheddar cheese which is manufactured by Saputo Dairy UK in Cornwall, South West England. Cathedral City's brand and logo is based on Wells Cathedral in Wells, Somerset.

== History ==
The original owners of the brand, Mendip Foods, were based in the cathedral city and civil parish of Wells, Somerset. Dairy Crest bought the brand from Mendip Foods Ltd in July 1995, moving production to Davidstow in Cornwall, which has neither city status nor a cathedral.

In 2019, the Canadian dairy company Saputo bought Dairy Crest.

As of November 2026, the cheese is manufactured at Davidstow Creamery and matured at the distribution centre at Nuneaton, Warwickshire.

The brand was launched in Canada and the United States in 2020.

== Health research ==
In 2014, Cathedral City was cited in research published by The BMJ highlighting the fact that branded cheeses generally had higher salt content than supermarket own-brands.

== Reception ==
YouGov's BrandIndex ranks Cathedral City the most popular brand in the Chilled/Frozen, Packaged Foods sector in Great Britain.
