= Black-eyed Pea (restaurant) =

United States restaurant chain

Coordinates: 32.813685°N 96.752568°W

Black-eyed Pea Restaurant
- Type: Restaurant
- Industry: Food
- Founded: 1975
- Headquarters: Houston, Texas, and Denver, Colorado
- Products: American Food & Spirits
- Website: Black-eyed Pea

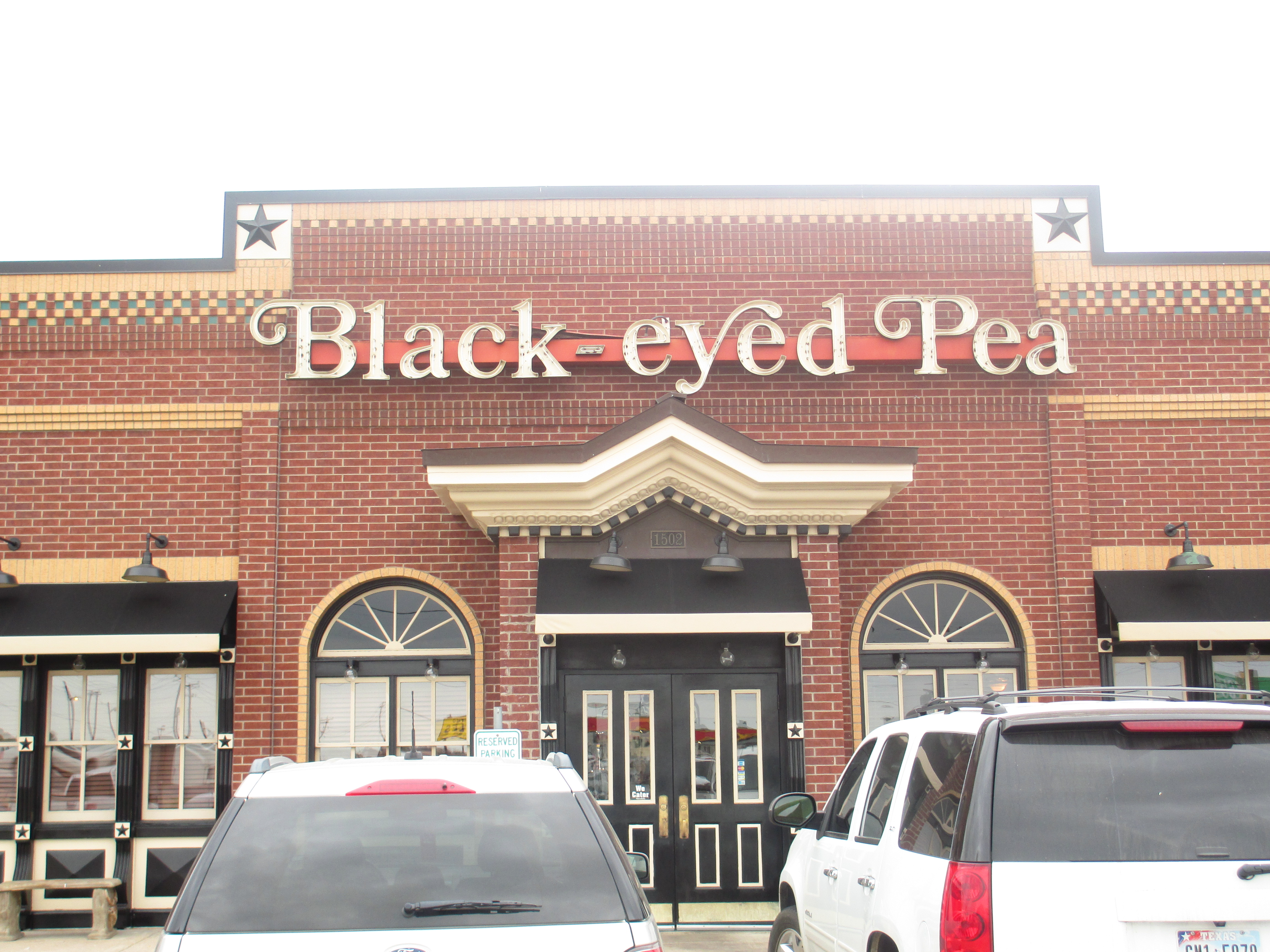
A now-defunct Black-eyed Pea outlet in Hillsboro, Texas, is located near Hill College.

Black-eyed Pea is an American restaurant chain, with outlets primarily in Colorado.

Two corporate entities operate the restaurants. The lone Texas restaurant is operated by Restaurants Acquisition I, L.L.C., whose company is based in Upper Kirby, Houston.

The Colorado restaurants are operated by RMR Colorado, LLC, headquartered in Greenwood Village, Colorado in Greater Denver.

== History ==
Black-eyed Pea was founded in 1975 by Dallas restaurateur Gene Street and Phil Cobb. The chain eventually expanded across the American South with 130 locations by the time it was sold to Unigate plc for about $65 million. In early 1997, DenAmerica purchased the Black-eyed Pea restaurant chain from Unigate plc.

On November 12, 2001, DenAmerica, now operating as Phoenix Restaurant Group, filed for Chapter 11 bankruptcy protection. This resulted in the closing of 48 Black-eyed Pea locations, reducing the chain to 44 locations (not including the Colorado locations, whose owners were in better financial shape). In 2002, under new management, Black-eyed Pea was reformatted as a "country casual" chain by adding more appetizers and seafood offerings, along with more grilled items, as well as an increased emphasis on its bar. In December 2008, former corporate employees Stephen Shaw and Alan Laughlin, along with Steve's brother Jim Shaw, purchased all rights to the Colorado locations of Black-eyed Pea. The three began changing menu items and pushing more advertising.

The first Black-eyed Pea opened, located on Cedar Springs Road in Oak Lawn, was closed after 40 years of operation on January 2, 2016.

On September 28, 2016, 12 of the 13 Black-eyed Pea restaurants in Texas shuttered their doors with little notice after filing bankruptcy in 2015.

In June 2019, the Black-eyed Pea in Hendersonville, TN closed its doors after 18 years of operation.

To date, Black-eyed Pea has a total of 8 locations, including just one in Texas and 7 in Colorado. The only Texas location is in Arlington, while the vast majority of the Colorado restaurants are in the Denver area.

== Menu ==
Black-eyed Pea's menu features home-style Southern U.S. cuisine such as fried catfish, chicken fried steak (including a "Texas Sized" version that takes up an entire plate), pot roast, mashed potatoes, fried okra, broccoli and rice casserole, corn bread, and rolls. Main entrees are usually ordered with a choice of two vegetables. The signature dish is the namesake of the chain, "black-eyed peas."

The restaurants also have full liquor service, provided the customer is at least 21.

== Dixie House ==
The Dixie House (now closed) was located in the Lakewood area of east Dallas, Texas. It served a variety of Southern, home-cooked style foods, such as a signature chicken-fried steak. The Dixie House was acquired by Black-Eye and the two restaurants shared many menu items. It retained a distinct, neighborhood-restaurant style. It received a mention in the 2008 Best Neighborhood Restaurant notices of D Magazine.
