= Cow & Gate =

UK dairy products company

Cow & Gate was a British dairy products company which expanded into milk bottling, distribution, and baby food production. It merged in 1959 with United Dairies to form Unigate plc, which today is known as Uniq plc. The Cow & Gate brand survives as a specialist baby food brand, owned by Netherlands-based Numico, now owned by Danone.

== West Surrey Central Dairy Company ==
After the 1882 death in Guildford, Surrey of grocer Charles Gates, his two sons Charles Arthur and Leonard took over the running of the shop, which held the local distribution franchise for Gilbey's wines and spirits, and also sold beer. In line with the temperance movement, the brothers added tea and coffee to their lines. However, in 1885, the brothers were persuaded to join the temperance movement, and hence poured their entire stock into the gutters of Guildford High Street.

Left with no livelihood, they converted their now empty shop into a dairy, trading under the name of the West Surrey Dairy. Using a milk separator, they bought milk from local farmers, and after extracting the cream and whey, sold the skim back to the farmers for pig feed. In 1888, three more of the Gates brothers and their sons joined the business, which led to the formal registration of the company under the name of the West Surrey Central Dairy Company Limited. From this base the company expanded quickly, buying creameries in the milk-producing West Country of England in Somerset and Dorset, and latterly in Ireland.

The early logo was not designed as such, but more created through what the milk jug makers had put on the outside of the company's distinctive light-brown milk jugs, which was described as: "A cow looking uncomfortably through a somewhat untypical four-barred gate, rather as if its neck had got stuck between the bars".

== Baby foods ==
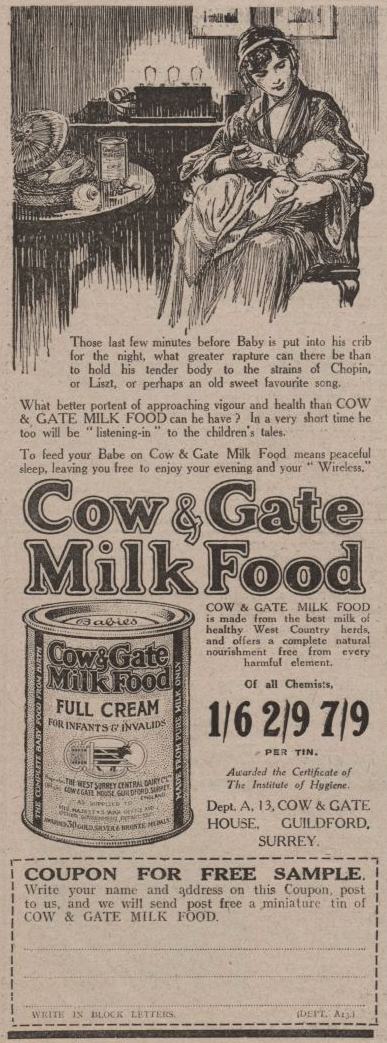
Advert for Cow & Gate Milk Food, "for infants & invalids", from the 16 November 1923 edition of The Radio Times (issue 8, page 276)

In 1904 Dr. Killick Millard, medical officer of health for Leicester, asked the company to supply powdered milk to help feed the children of poor families. In 1908, the resultant high-protein "Cow & Gate Pure English Dried Milk" was first marketed on a large scale. In 1924 the company developed a special export version for tropical climates, and from this time registered the secondary Dried Milk Products Company Ltd to commercially wholesale various dried milk products to commercial food manufacturers.

The entire company was renamed Cow & Gate in 1929. During the 1930s it worked with medical clinicians to scientifically develop specialized formulas to cater to infants with special needs, including:

- Frailac: for premature infants
- Allergiac: for babies sensitive to certain constituents of cow's milk
- Cereal food designed to start babies on mixed feeding at an earlier age

== Expansion ==
After the First World War, the WSCDC had gone public on the London Stock Exchange under the chairmanship of Bramwell Gates, son of Walter Gates. Gates started purchasing creameries and bottling plants across the United Kingdom, starting with Wallens Dairy Company of Kilburn in 1924. In the next 15 years the dairy business footprint expanded across Cornwall, Lancashire, Yorkshire and much of Wales. To service these extensive creameries and bottling plants, which each had their own local distribution chain, the company decided to set up its own logistics company to manage the operation. Over the next 70 years, Wincanton Transport become one of the UK's largest transport concerns.

In 1933, the company purchased a controlling interest in General Milk Products of Canada. Thus when the Second World War broke out in 1939, and the government banned all food exports, Cow & Gate could keep its accessible export markets fulfilled from Canada-sourced production throughout the war.

== Unigate ==
After Ernest Augustus Taylor took over from the 83-year-old Bramwell Gates in 1958, his first duty was to negotiate a merger with United Dairies, the nation's largest producer of dairy products. The merger was completed in 1959, producing the new listed company, Unigate.

== Cow & Gate Infant Milk for Hungrier Babies ==
Cow & Gate's Infant Milk for Hungrier Babies is marketed for a "bottlefed little one [who] has a bigger appetite." The difference between this and their normal range is that this has higher content of casein. However, this has not passed recommendations of pediatricians as it can lead to cause digestive discomfort, constipation in some infants due to the longer digestive time, and kidney damage in babies if prepared incorrectly such as adding extra scoops to thicken the milk leading to dehydration. In fact, there is limited evidence that this milk will settle a baby, or let them sleep longer, or even satisfy their hunger better.
