= Loughcullen =

Lake in Co. Kilkenny, Leinster, Ireland

- Townland
- Location in Ireland
- Coordinates: 52°19′00″N 7°06′47″W
- Country: Ireland
- Province: Leinster
- County: County Kilkenny

Government
  - Dáil Éireann: Carlow-Kilkenny
- Time zone: UTC+0 (WET)
  - Summer (DST): UTC-1 (IST (WEST))
- Irish Grid Reference: S679519

Lough Cullen (Irish: Loch Cuilinn, meaning 'Holly Lake') is the only lake in County Kilkenny, Ireland. The lake has numerous legends attached to it.

Near the town of Kilmacow, Loughcullen is name of the local area. Located in the civil parish Kilcolumb in the barony of Ida, just 12 kilometres (7.5 mi) from Waterford City it is close to the County Waterford border.

Hurling is popular in the area and, on match days involving the Kilkenny senior hurling team, Loughcullen is often decorated in amber and black, the colours of the hurling team.

== History ==
Lough Cullen Co-operative Agriculture and Dairy Society (C.D.S) was set up in 1904. Loughcullen consists generally of land owned by farms in neighbouring Big Wood. Loughcullen used to be the site for the Loughcullen Creamery which served all local farmers however the creamery has closed and is now a supplier to local agricultural workers.

== See also ==
- List of townlands in County Kilkenny
