= Callum McCarthy =

Sir Callum McCarthy (born 29 February 1944) is the former chairman of the Financial Services Authority. He is also the former non-executive chairman of Promontory Financial Group's UK affiliate.

== Early life and education ==
McCarthy attended Manchester Grammar School, then graduated in history from Merton College, Oxford. He also has a PhD in economics from Stirling University and an MS from the Graduate School of Business at Stanford University, where he was a Sloan Fellow.

== Career ==
McCarthy has held various high-profile private sector and government regulatory positions:

- 1965 – Economics researcher at chemical corporation ICI for seven years on graduating in 1965.
- 1972–85 – Several posts at the Department of Trade and Industry including Principal Private Secretary to Roy Hattersley when he was Secretary of State for Prices and Consumer Protection and to Norman Tebbit when he was Secretary of State for Trade and Industry.
- 1985 – Director of Corporate Finance at investment bank Kleinwort Benson
- 1989 – managing director and Deputy Head of Corporate Finance of Barclays' investment banking arm, BZW. McCarthy later become chief executive officer of Barclays Bank group operations in Japan before moving to head the Bank's businesses in North America.
- September 1998 – Appointed by Peter Mandelson to become Director-General of the gas regulator Ofgas.
- 1999 – Chief Executive of new energy super-regulator Ofgem, where he oversaw the introduction of greater competition into the gas and electricity markets
- September 2003 – Chairman of the Financial Services Authority (FSA)
- October 2008 – Non-executive board member of HM Treasury
- Current – Non-executive chairman of Castle Trust

== Personal life ==
Married with three children, he is a keen beekeeper.

He is the father of novelist Tom Mcarthy.

== In popular culture ==
In the 2011 film Too Big to Fail, McCarthy is played by actor George Taylor.
