= Martin Read =

British businessman (born 1950)

Sir Martin Read CBE
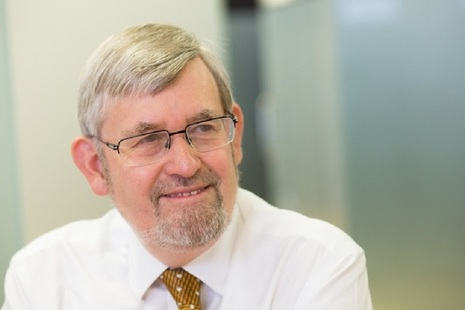
- Born: February 16, 1950 (age 76)
- Occupations: Businessman, government advisor
- Known for: Chairman of Wincanton plc

Sir Martin Peter Read, CBE (born 16 February 1950) is a British businessman who has been Chairman of the Senior Salaries Review Body since January 2015, and Chairman of Wincanton plc since 2018.

He was educated at Queen Mary's School for Boys, Basingstoke, Peterhouse, Cambridge (BA, 1971) and Merton College, Oxford (DPhil Physics, 1974). He was made an Honorary Fellow of Merton College in 2006. He was formerly Group Chief Executive of Logica from 1993 to 2007 and Chairman of Laird plc from 2014 to 2018. He was appointed Commander of the Order of the British Empire (CBE) in 2011 and was knighted in the 2023 New Year Honours for services to industry and for public and voluntary service.

Read was chief executive of Logica from 1993 to 2007. He has also served as a non-executive director on the boards of Siemens Holdings, Lloyd's, Aegis Group, Invensys, British Airways, Boots, ASDA and the UK Government Efficiency and Reform Board. He has also been an adviser to private equity firms Candover and Actis as well as to Indian technology companies HCL and Zensar.

He is chair of the Review Body on Senior Salaries which advises senior UK government officials such as the Prime Minister, Lord Chancellor, Secretary of State for Defence, Secretary of State for Health and the Home Secretary on the pay of senior judges, civil servants, army officers, NHS managers, Police and Crime Commissioners. chief police officers and other senior public appointments.

Read is a board member of the Cabinet Office Efficiency and Reform Group, which "aims to save money, transform the way public services are delivered, improve user experience and support UK growth." He previously served as chairman of two government owned companies to manage "contracts and payments under the electricity market reform programme (the Low Carbon Contracts Company and the Electricity Settlements Company)."
