= Müller Milk & Ingredients =

UK milk supplier and distributor

- Industry: Dairy
- Founded: 1947 (as Robert Wiseman Dairies)
- Headquarters: Glasgow, Scotland, UK
- Key people: Jon Jenkins (CEO)
- Products: Liquid milk, cream, spreadable butter
- Owner: Müller
- Website: www.muller.co.uk/our-brands/mueller-milk-ingredients/

Müller Milk & Ingredients, formerly Robert Wiseman Dairies and later Müller Wiseman Dairies, is the largest milk supplier and distributor in Great Britain. It is part of the Müller UK & Ireland Group, owned by the German Müller family.

It has eleven major dairies (in Aberdeen, East Kilbride, Glasgow, Manchester, Droitwich Spa, Bridgwater, Severnside, Foston, Market Drayton and Hanworth). The company also produces Frijj milkshake, cream, and spreadable butter. The milk business of Dairy Crest was merged into the company in December 2015, following the purchase of the business by its parent.

Following completion of the sale, the company was renamed. It supplies around 30% of Britain's fresh milk, and has Britain's biggest fresh milk distribution network. The company now delivers milk to around 715,000 households via their Milk & More doorstep delivery business. Müller Milk & Ingredients also supply several large grocery retailers.

== History ==
Robert Wiseman Dairies was founded in 1947 by Robert Wiseman Senior. It started off as a small family farm in East Kilbride that carried out doorstep deliveries using a horse and cart. Alan Wiseman joined the business straight from school in 1967, and worked his way up to become chairman. Eight years later, Robert Wiseman Junior became managing director.

In 1988 the company built a bespoke dairy in Bellshill, Lanarkshire. This dairy was designed for supermarket supplies and quickly gained contracts from some of the larger retailers. Having achieved success within Scotland, the directors were determined to continue expanding the business and saw an opportunity to repeat what had been achieved in Scotland, by establishing a production base in the North of England.

Robert Wiseman Dairies was listed on the London Stock Exchange in 1994. In the same year, the government abolished the Milk Marketing Board, allowing dairy farmers to sell their milk to whomever they chose. At this time, Wiseman created the Wiseman Milk Partnership, a group of farmers contracted to supply their milk direct to Robert Wiseman Dairies.

The company opened a dairy in Droitwich Spa in May 2001, which at the time was the biggest in Europe, and has a maximum capacity to process 650 million litres per year. 2006 saw the acquisition of the Milk Link liquid milk business, which meant the company stretched from Keith in the North of Scotland to Cornwall in the South of England.

Robert Wiseman Dairies opened a dairy in Bridgwater in September 2008. In January 2012, the company agreed to a takeover by the family-run German dairy company, Müller, and was returned to private ownership. The business then became known as Müller Wiseman Dairies, and is part of the Müller UK & Ireland Group.

Carl Ravenhall was appointed managing director of Müller Wiseman Dairies in March 2013. In November 2014, Dairy Crest announced the sale of its milk processing and distribution business to Müller for £80 million, to be combined with Müller Wiseman Dairies. The sale was approved by the Competition and Markets Authority on 19 October 2015, and was completed on 26 December 2015.

== Products ==
Müller produces some of the UK’s fresh milk brands including the country’s first semi-skimmed milk, Fresh’n’Lo, Puriti (with its extended shelf life), and The One (a 1% fat milk).

A significant brand is Black and White and there are six regional labels currently in the portfolio: Grampian, Milk from Scotland, West Country, Cornish, Milk from Wales and Northern Dairy. They also process and distribute double, whipping, single and extra-thick cream along with spreadable butter.

Since December 2015, Müller has produced Frijj milkshakes. Müller also owns the UK’s largest butter plant, in Market Drayton. The £17 million plant was officially opened on 6 December 2013 by Theo Müller Senior and Owen Paterson, MP for North Shropshire and then Secretary of State for Environment, Food and Rural Affairs. The plant is capable of producing 45,000 tonnes of salted, unsalted and lactic butter made with cream from British dairy farms.

== Operations ==
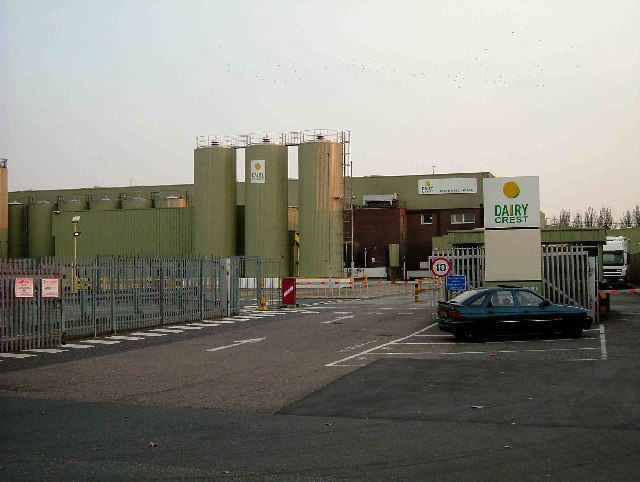
Muller's Chadwell Heath milk production site (formerly Dairy Crest)

In July 2013, the company announced the closure of its depots in Keith and Whitburn because of a significant reduction in the number of delivery runs from each site.

In October 2013, Müller Dairies’ Droitwich dairy, one of the biggest in their portfolio, was damaged by a fire. Despite the immediate shutdown of operations at the business’s largest fresh milk dairy, the company maintained supplies of fresh milk to its customers by increasing production at other sites and through co-operation with other dairy suppliers. In December 2015, the company took on the online ordering service for its doorstep customers known as Milk & More, formerly operated by Dairy Crest.
