= Uniq plc =

Former British food manufacturer

- Type: Public
- Industry: Foods
- Founded: 1959
- Headquarters: Gerrards Cross, UK
- Key people: Ross Warburton, Chairman; Geoff Eaton, CEO
- Revenue: £736.1 million (2007)
- Operating income: £(3.6) million (2007)
- Net income: £(41.7) million (2007)
- Number of employees: 6,559 (2007)
- Parent: Greencore
- Website: ~~www.uniq.com~~

Uniq plc (formerly Unigate plc) was a British food manufacturer. Listed on the London Stock Exchange and once a constituent of the FTSE 100 Index, it was taken over by Irish foods conglomerate Greencore in 2011.

== History ==
The company was formed in 1959 by the merger of the UK's largest dairy products company United Dairies, with Cow & Gate, earlier known as the West Surrey Central Dairy Company, forming Unigate.

On merger, aside from its extensive milk home delivery network, its range of food products included Cow & Gate baby foods (now part of Royal Numico) and Farmer's Wife cream. It also developed St Ivel cheese spreads and Utterly Butterly.

In 1963, Unigate acquired Midland Counties Dairies, but as milk consumption levelled and then started to decline in the 1960s, it began diversifying into non-dairy businesses. It began by buying up grocery stores and restaurants, and by the 1970s bought supermarket chain Kibby's, Quids-In clothing shops, Uni-Wash laundrettes, and some Kentucky Fried Chicken franchises. In 1973, it acquired Scot Bowyers, a meat-processing company, in 1975 United States–based Italian cheese manufacturer Frigo, and in 1978 US specialty cheesemaker, Gardenia.

In 1977, dairyman John Clement became CEO and chairman. To stop the decline in the dairy business, he sold 75% of its dairy manufacturing businesses to the nationalised company the Milk Marketing Board for £87 million. After paying off debt, Unigate acquired:

- 1981: moving company Giltspur; Turners Turkeys; US-based Mexican food chain Casa Bonita
- 1984: poultry processor, J.P. Wood
- 1985: Arlington Motor Holdings and in Colchester Car Auctions, both added to subsidiary Wincanton Transport
- 1986: Prufrock, which specialized in southern-style food through the Black-Eyed Pea chain of restaurants

But the diversification did not help the balance sheet, and in the late 1980s the project was reversed. By the end of the decade, despite Unigate remaining the UK's biggest milk supplier, dairy products only made up one third of group turnover. With losses mounting and debt rising, Clement was replaced in both board positions by the end of 1991.

In the following decade, Unigate focused on food and distribution, selling off non-core and unprofitable businesses, which raised £700 million. Half of this came through the £332 million sale of its share in Nutricia, the holding company that owned the Cow & Gate brand. The company also bought brands to supplement its new direction, spending £400 million on French firms Prodipal, a maker of yogurts and desserts, and Vedial, a maker of spreads. In September 1996, Unigate paid £77.25 million for the UK and Italian margarine and spreads business of Kraft Foods International, including Vitalite.

In May 1998, the company attempted an unsuccessful £1.59 billion takeover of diversified conglomerate Hillsdown Holdings. In February 1999 the company did acquire Fisher Quality Foods, a UK supplier of sauces, dressings, and marinades, from the Albert Fisher Group for £43 million. In the meantime, Hillsdown under shareholder pressure had begun a break-up, spinning off its chilled convenience food subsidiary as Terranova. In March 1999, Unigate initiated a hostile £228.5 million takeover bid for Terranova, which was accepted after the bid was raised to £274 million.

But by the late 1990s, the decline in doorstep deliveries and price pressure from supermarkets led to mounting losses, and in 2000 the milk and cheese division was sold to Dairy Crest. On completion of the sale, the company changed its name to Uniq in July 2000. In 2001, it demerged Wincanton, its logistics subsidiary, by way of an initial public offering.

It sold its yoghurt business in 2002 to raise money to concentrate on the convenience foods market. In March 2009 Uniq reached an agreement for the sale of its UK chilled fish business, Pinneys of Scotland, to The Seafood Company Ltd (part of the Foodvest Group).

On 12 July 2011, Greencore announced it intended to buy Uniq. The deal was completed in November 2011, and Uniq is now subsumed within the operations of Greencore.

== Operations ==
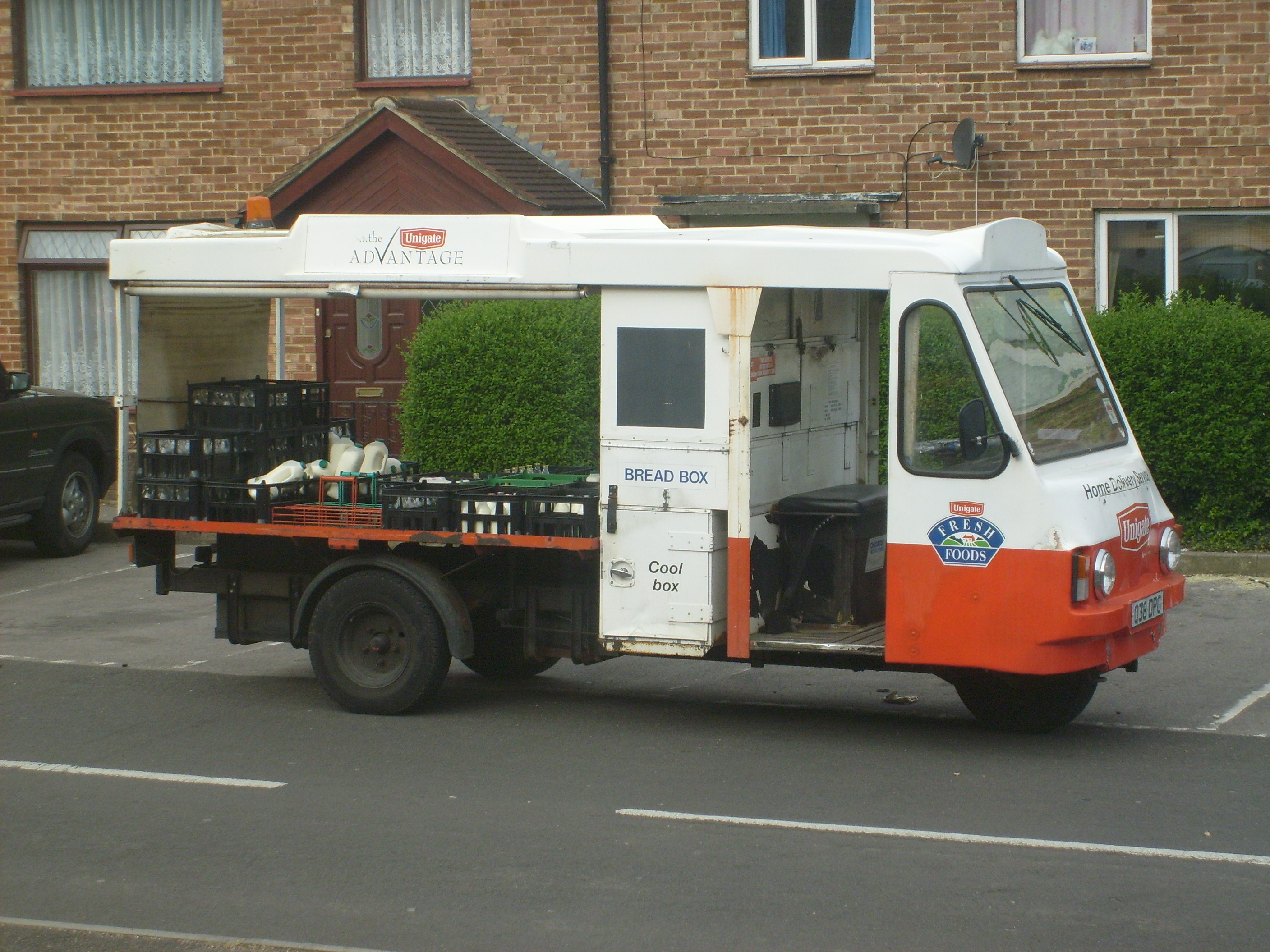
Dairy Crest took over the Unigate home delivery business, including its Wales & Edwards Rangemaster milk floats.

The former company has sites in Spalding (Smedley's Salads prepared salads), Northampton, Evercreech (former St Ivel site), Minsterley in Shropshire (former site of Northern Foods until May 2004) and Paignton (produces all of Cadbury's chilled desserts such as chocolate mousses). The Northampton site produces most of Marks & Spencer's and Morrisons' prepared sandwiches.

== Structure ==
The Unigate headquarters in the 1960s was on Bythesea Road in Trowbridge. The headquarters moved in 1981 from Trowbridge to St Ivel House on Interface Business Park in Royal Wootton Bassett.
