= Philippa Whipple =

British judge

The Right Honourable Lady Justice Whipple DBE
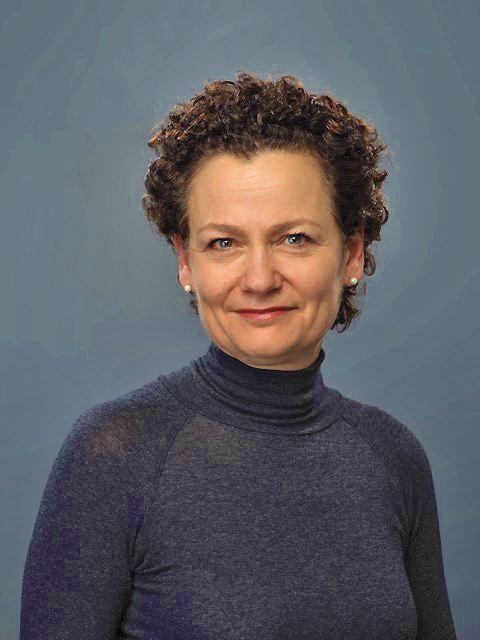
- Whipple in 2017

Lady Justice of Appeal
- Incumbent
- Assumed office 15 November 2021
- Monarchs: Elizabeth II; Charles III

High Court Judge Queen's Bench Division
- In office 2015–2021

Personal details
- Born: Philippa Jane Edwards; 7 May 1966 (age 60) Aldershot, Hampshire, England
- Education: Merton College, Oxford

Dame Philippa Jane Whipple, DBE (née Edwards; born 7 May 1966) is a British judge, former barrister, and former solicitor. Between October 2015 and November 2021, she was a Justice of the High Court assigned to the Queen's Bench Division. Since November 2021 she has been a judge of the Court of Appeal.

== Early life ==
Whipple was born in or near Aldershot, England, on 7 May 1966 to the Hon. John Braham Scott Edwards, Esq., then a Judge of the South Eastern Circuit, and his wife, Veronica Mary Edwards. She was educated at St Mary's School, Ascot, and then earned a bachelor's degree in law from Merton College, Oxford.

== Career ==
Whipple began her legal career as a solicitor, admitted in 1991. She was called to the Bar by Middle Temple in 1994 and was a tenant at 1 Crown Office Row. She was appointed as a Recorder, in 2005. On 22 March 2010, she was made a Queen's Counsel (QC). On 1 October 2015, Whipple was appointed a Justice of the High Court in London.

=== Taylor Clark v. HMRC ===
Towards the later end of her career at the bar, Whipple represented the applicant (Taylor Clark) in Taylor Clark Leisure Plc v HM Revenue and Customs, in litigation in Scotland. As part of an appeal in the course of that case, Whipple sought to be allowed to appear before the Court of Session.

In May 2015, the a three-judge panel of the Court of Session presided by the then-Lord President declined to permit Whipple to address a Scottish court on behalf of a client in respect of a tax matter. Whilst the Court acknowledged that under European law, counsel from other member states could appear in Scottish courts, the Court observed that the provisions did not extend to counsel in different parts of the same member state (i.e. the UK, then a member of the European Union), finding that the Secretary of State could have, but had not, exercised his power under separate national legislation to make regulations on the matter, and that in the absence of such provisions, Scottish law precluded the ad hoc admission of counsel in cases like that of Whipple. The court additionally observed that Whipple could have sought full admission via an expedited procedure to the Scottish bar.

The substantive appeal was ultimately allowed the following year, before that decision was in turn overturned on further appeal by the Supreme Court.

== Honours ==
On 3 November 2015, Whipple was appointed a Dame Commander of the Order of the British Empire (DBE). She is an honorary fellow of Merton College, Oxford. She was appointed to the Privy Council on 15 December 2021.
