= Dairy industry in the United Kingdom =

The dairy industry in the United Kingdom is the industry of dairy farming that takes place in the UK.

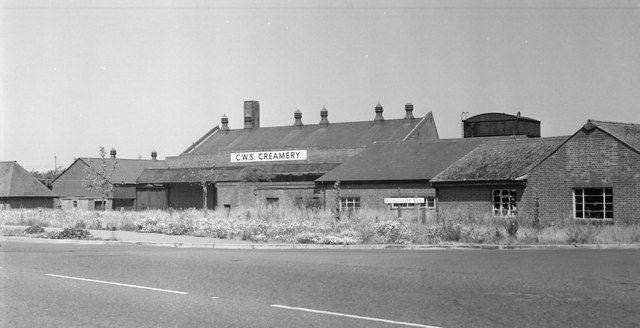
The CWS Creamery on Borough Road c. 1960

== Production ==
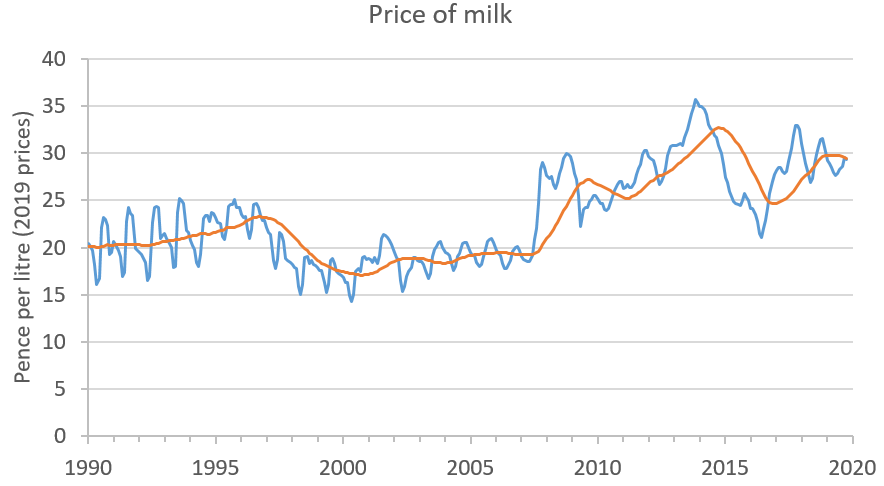
Price of milk in the UK from 1990 to 2019, both each month and the two-year average. Values are in 2019 prices.

In Europe, UK milk production is third after France & Germany and is around the tenth highest in the world. There are around 12,000 dairy farms in the UK.

Around 14 billion litres of milk are commercially produced in the UK each year.

Britain eats around 2000 tonnes of cheese a day. The World Cheese Awards are run by the Guild of Fine Food.

== History ==
Express Dairies was formed in 1864. Nestlé, as the Anglo-Swiss Condensed Milk Company, opened a creamery, to make condensed milk, in Aylesbury in September 1870; the Aylesbury Vale area was a known dairy region. Semley in south-west Wiltshire, near Dorset, had the first site in the UK, around 1871, to cool milk, for transportation, on the West of England line. Anthony Hailwood started his Cheshire Sterilised Milk Company in 1894, the first in the UK.

St Ivel made a range of products in Yeovil in Somerset. United Dairies was formed in 1915, in the Wiltshire area, to allow more men to fight in the war. Joseph Maggs was chairman from 1921 to 1943.

The World Dairy Congress was held in London in June 1928. The manufacture of ice-cream was discussed, with Prof Albert Mertens of Louvain University in Belgium, and Otto Gratz of the Royal Hungarian Dairy Experimental Station.

In the 1930s the Dairy Show was held in Islington, in late October; since 2010 it has been held at the NEC. At a meeting of the Royal Empire Society in January 1931, with Sir William Wayland, it was decided to form the Empire Dairy Council, in offices on Northumberland Avenue.

In October 1931, to protect the French dairy industry, France imposed quotas on dairy exports to France.

The Import Duties Act 1932 came into effect in March 1932. The British Empire Economic Conference, held in Canada in July and August 1932, decided on Imperial Preference for scaling import duties on Empire dairy produce. The Irish Free State attended the conference; Ireland operated as part of the British Empire until May 1937, under the Irish Free State Constitution Act 1922. But from 1932, Ireland did not get the same reduction in import duties as other Empire countries.

In 1934, the UK dairy industry turned over £63m, with 320,000 employees. Over 80% of the world's butter exports, and 50% of the world's cheese exports came to the UK. 90% of the cheese exports of Canada and Australia came to the UK, with all of Eire's butter exports.

In the 1930s Cadbury made 900 tons of Dairy Milk a week, from 26 million gallons of milk a year, with plants in Denbighshire, Knighton in Staffordshire, Marlbrook in Hereford, and Newent and Frampton-on-Severn in Gloucestershire. During the war, only two million gallons of this milk went to chocolate production, with the rest for cheese production. By 1952, Cadbury collected 29 million gallons of milk, with 5 million for chocolate. Cadbury circumvented government rationing by supplying milk from its site at Rathmore, County Kerry; a third of the milk that Cadbury required came from this Irish plant. The Ministry of Food stopped restricting milk production on April 1, 1954.

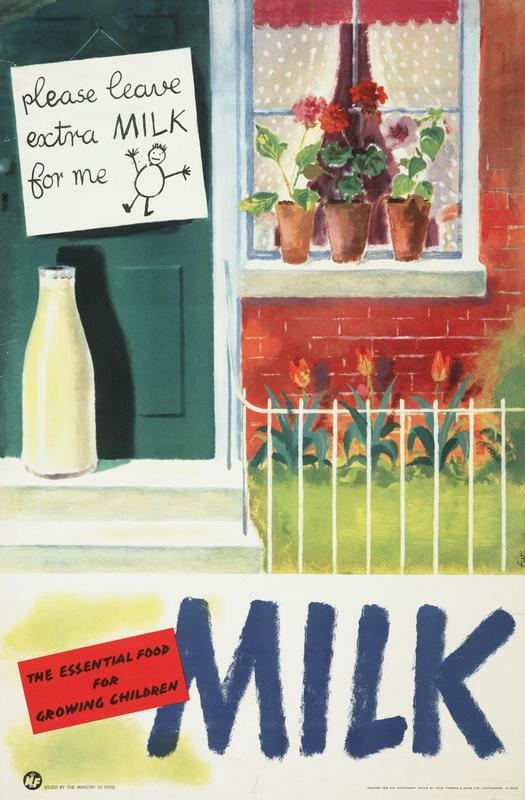
World War II advertising from the IWM

Milk rationing was announced on August 6 1941. A holder of a child's ration book would be entitled to seven pints a week, along with expectant mothers. Other children with the general ration book, born from January 1924 to December 1935 could have three and a half pints. Northern Ireland had no milk rationing whatsoever, due to less milk was taken to creameries for other types of production, it could be available for liquid milk. But workers in industry could have slightly more, with their tea and coffee, with a dispensation for canteens. Milk rationing took effect from October 1 1941. Men over the age of 25 in the liquid milk industry became a reserved occupation, and over the age of 30 in the cheese industry. This meant that around 750 male workers entered the forces. Adults could have two pints a week.

Milk production dropped significantly in Scotland, so by 1942 milk was imported from Northern Ireland to Scotland. This ship had an accident in late November 1944.

From October 1 1942, the Ministry of Food took over the whole collection of milk from suppliers under the Milk Movements Branch, and instructed how milk was distributed across the country, as a whole. Milk was sold across England and Wales at 4.5d a pint. It involved a staff reduction in the delivery of milk of around 30%, and it reduced consumption of petrol by around 35%.

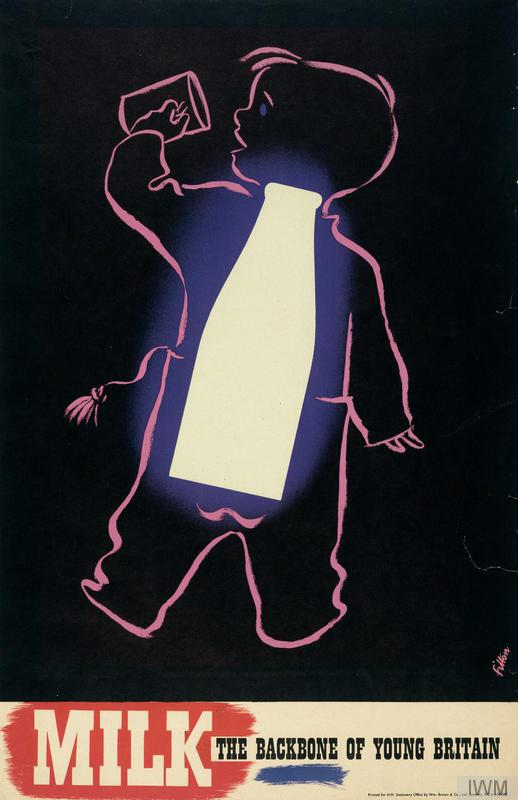
World War II propaganda poster

In late October 1942 the ration reduced from 3 to 2.5 pints. 70% of UK milk was pasteurised. On Sunday November 22 1942 it reduced from 2.5 to 2 pints. On Sunday March 14 1943 it increased from 2 to 2.5 pints. In late April 1943 it increased from 2.5 to 3 pints. On Sunday May 2 1943 it increased to 4 pints. On Sunday July 4 1943 it reduced from 4 to 3 pints. On Sunday August 1 1943 it reduced from 3 to 2.5 pints, with 7.5 pints per 100 hot beverages for catering establishments. On Sunday May 7 1944 it increased from 2.5 pints to 4 pints. On Sunday June 18 1944 it reduced from 4 to 3 pints, with nine pints per 100 hot beverages for catering establishments, instead of 12. On Sunday 2 July 1944 it reduced from 3 to 2.5 pints, this was largely due to the D-Day invasion. On November 5 1944 it reduced 2.5 to 2 pints, introduced by William Mabane.

In January 1945 Conservative minister, Robert Hudson, believed that milk rationing would last until 1949. On Sunday March 18 1945 it increased from 2 pints to 2.5 pints. On Sunday April 22 1945 the milk ration for non-priority adults increased from 2.5 to 3 pints per week.

Due to a six-week drought in August 1947, the milk ration was cut from 2.5 to 2 pints from Sunday August 24 1947, introduced by John Strachey (politician) and Edith Summerskill. Due to prolonged food rationing, John Strachey was much maligned by the general public and some newspapers.

Milk rationing ended briefly on May 16 1948, but it was reinstated three weeks later on Sunday June 6 1948. Most people would be allowed three pints a week, and catering establishments would be allowed nine pints per 100 hot beverages. on Sunday August 21 1949, there could be six pints per 100 hot beverages for catering establishments, not including schools and hospitals. On Sunday November 6 1949 the ration increased from 2.5 to 3 pints.

Milk rationing ended on Sunday January 15 1950, but no cream was sold in the UK until April 1953. Milk could be added to manufactured food, from April 1953 as well.

On November 24 1945, most food rationing in US had stopped, except sugar. Milk rationing stopped in Australia in July 1948. In the Netherlands, milk rationing stopped on July 1 1949. Rationing in Ireland finished July 4 1952.

Pasteurised milk technology was developed in the 1930s. In the 1960s, most milk was taken to 161 degrees Fahrenheit for 15 seconds. Pasteurisation was the HTST process, or high-temperature short-time, also known as flash pasteurization.

In 1954 production from the Cadbury milk crumb factory halved at Rathmore in Ireland, as UK milk production was no longer restricted. In England & Wales, Cadbury now took 8m more gallons of milk.

St Ivel became part of Unigate in late February 1959. St Ivel had made mostly cheese, being the largest dairy company in the Commonwealth.

The International Dairy Congress was held in London in June 1959, with chairman Sir Thomas Peacock, with research led by Professor Herbert Davenport Kay CBE FRS (1893–1976).

In 1960 Somerset produced the most milk in England.

From November 1967, the Milk Distributive Council of England and Wales introduced a voluntary colour code of milk bottle tops. From December 1, 1973, a compulsory colour code for milk bottle tops was introduced. South Devon and Channel Island milk had had the 'gold top' trade distinctions since 1956.

When cardboard containers were introduced in the 1960s, this could be sold at a higher price than bottles, as the bottle price had been set by the government from January 1940. Grand Met bought Express Dairies in September 1969.

In the mid-1970s, the UK imported 80% of its dairy products. Unigate in the 1970s was the largest dairy company in the UK, with the Unigate Foods division trading under the well-known 'St Ivel' label, headquartered in Wootton Bassett in north Wiltshire near Swindon.

In July 1979, Unigate sold 75% of its milk production to the Milk Marketing Board for £55m. This gave the Milk Marketing Board 22% of butter in England and Wales, and 25% of cheese.

Sales, in bulk, to supermarkets largely began from 1980. By 1985, 40% of milk was bought in supermarkets.

Semi-skimmed milk arrived in 1981, largely as a result of being in the EEC.

In 1981 consumption of milk was under 6,400 million litres a year. It had peaked in the mid-1970s at over 7,000 million litres per year. In 1974 a pint of milk was fixed at 5p, which was kept artificially-low during the late 1970s; by 1981 it had risen three-fold to 18p.

In January 1989, Unigate, run by John Clement, sold all its milk processing north of the Thames to Dairy Crest, for £152m (£126m net). The sale included seven processing sites and eighty nine distribution depots. Before the sale Unigate produced a third of liquid milk in England and Wales. It gave Dairy Crest 16% of milk processing in England and Wales.

The Food Safety Act 1990 introduced supermarket 'best before' and 'use by' dates. The British milk industry became deregulated on 1 November 1994. In 1995 sales of semi-skimmed milk took over that of whole milk.

Arla operations in the UK merged with Express Dairies, of Leicester, with chairman Sir David Naish, to become Arla UK in October 2003. Around 2007 vegan Oatly, of Sweden, entered British supermarkets.

Friesland Campina UK, of the Netherlands, moved from Horsham in West Sussex, to London in 2024; their Yazoo (drink), launched in 1987, is the most popular flavoured milk product in the UK.

=== Butter ===
In the 1920s Katharine Coward researched the amount of vitamins present in butter.

In 1924 half of the UK's butter came from within the British Empire, and 90% of the UK's cheese. In the 1930s Denmark was the largest exporter of dairy produce in Europe. In 1931, the UK imported around 120,000 tons of Danish butter. In 1936, 53% of butter imports came from the British Empire. In 1932 the UK imported 88% of butter. In 1938 the UK imported 472,000 tons of butter.

Butter was rationed from January 8, 1940, with bacon, ham and sugar. It was the first set of foods to be rationed. Prices were regulated under the Price Regulation Committee, under the Prices of Goods Act 1939. The adequate supply of food was rationed locally by a relevant Food Control Committee.

From Monday March 1940, the butter ration was increased to eight ounces a week. From Monday July 22, 1940, the ration was six ounces from either butter or margarine. By August 1940, butter supplies were reducing. Charles Hill, later the Minister of Food in 1954, was the resident doctor on 'Kitchen Front' on BBC radio from June 1940, which instructed people how to eat adequately with rationed food. On March 10 1941, the butter ration was increased from 2oz to 4oz. 4oz of margarine could also be taken, with the 4oz of butter. From June 30, 1941, the butter ration was reduced from four to two ounces, per week.

Butter and cheese rationing was introduced on April 1, 1943, in the US, by Claude R. Wickard, later run by the War Food Administration.

Butter rationing finished in the Netherlands on June 23, 1949, but the Netherlands had had immensely severe food shortages. Butter rationing in Denmark caused a change of government in late October 1950, when Hans Hedtoft was replaced by Erik Eriksen, who stopped the rationing of butter, a week later, on November 7, 1950; it had been introduced in Denmark on November 9, 1940. By 1948, the only dairy rationing in Eire was 6oz butter.

On November 30 1952 the ration increased from 2 to 3 ounces. On February 21 1954 the ration increased from 1 to 4 ounces. In late January 1954 it was finally decided to stop butter and cheese rationing, from early May 1954. Butter, with cheese, rationing finished on May 8 1954, under Charles Hill, Baron Hill of Luton. During the war people ate two and a half times the amount of margarine than of butter. Only in 1958 did butter consumption overtake margarine. When rationing finished, the national consumption of butter increased by 51% from 1953 to 1957. Consumption of margarine dropped by 9%. Consumption of sugar rose by 30%.

In the drought year of 1959, the UK produced 3% of its butter. In the early 1960s, the UK produced 12% of its butter.

After the Second World War, New Zealand shipped its excess production of butter to the UK. Anchor butter largely became a top-seller from then on.

The Butter Information Council was set up on May 4, 1954, by butter producers in Australia and Denmark. It became the Butter Council in 1981, and closed in December 1995.

Country Life butter began in 1970. St Ivel owned the St Hubert and Le Fleurier spreads in France, until 2017, made in Ludres in Grand Est.

In 1975 the UK was producing only 5% of its butter requirements; New Zealand supplied 20% (Anchor butter). It had been only 5% of butter from British manufacturers in 1938, hence butter was so stringently rationed in the Second World War. In 1973, the UK had produced 20% of its butter requirements, importing around 500,000 tonnes of butter.

The other main foreign supplier of butter, in the 1970s, was Lurpak, of Denmark, also part of the EEC, and Lurpak was selling more and more to Britain during the 1970s; Danelea butter also came from Denmark. By 1975 Germany claimed to export 10% of British butter requirements, with exports increasing from 3,000 tonnes in 1973 to 40,000 tonnes in 1975.

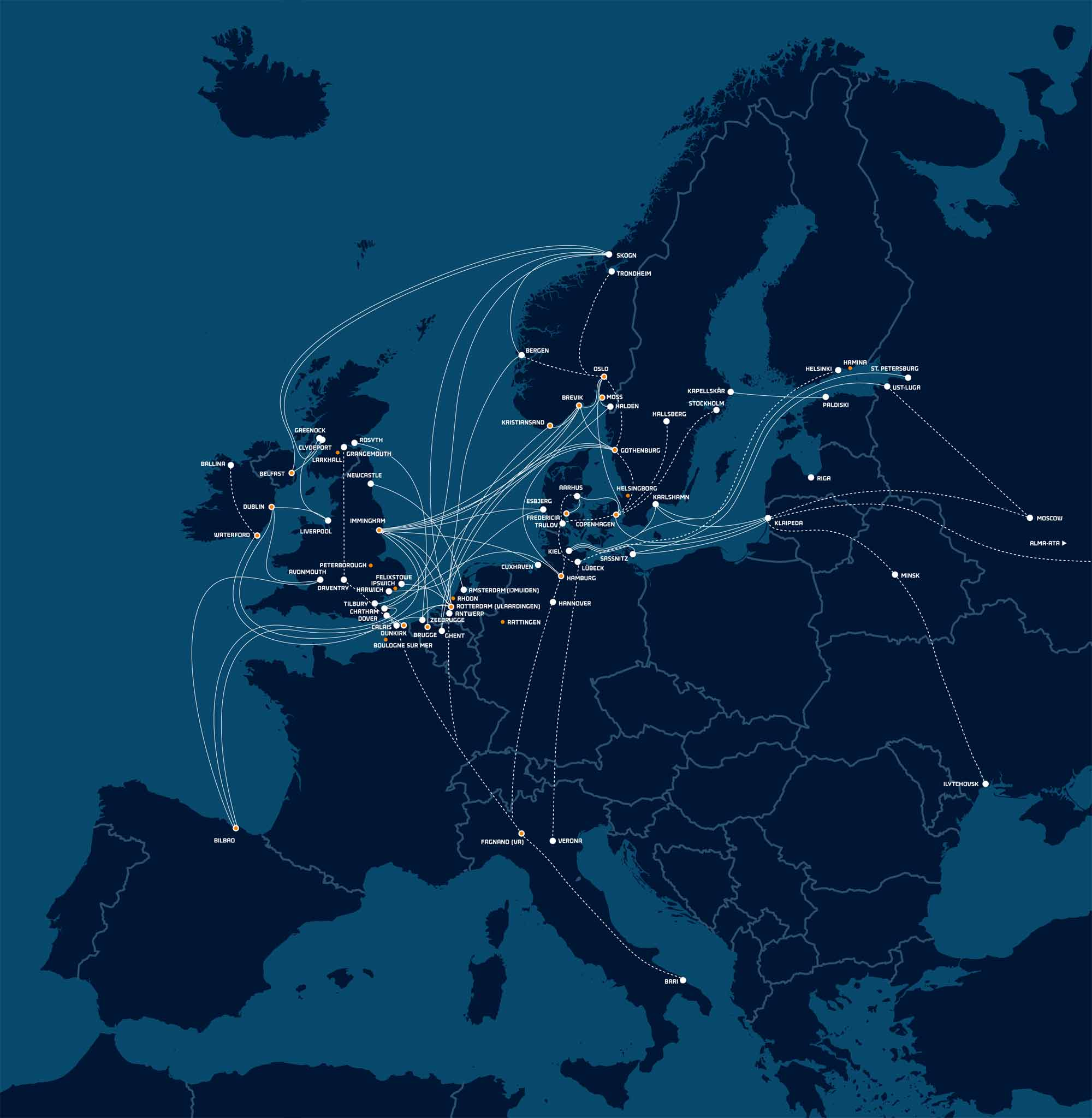
DFDS routes

In the 1960s two ships of the United Steamship Company (now DFDS) Blenda and Alexandra brought 1,200 tons, each week, of Danish butter, eggs and bacon, to North Shields docks. The two ships were referred to as 'the butter boats' or 'the butter service', taking 18 hours. Danish freight also went from the Port of Esbjerg to Grimsby and Harwich.

The first DFDS boat to Grimsby in 1890, was the 'Lolland'. DFDS 'Somerset' first sailed to Grimsby on January 18 1967, with the 'Somerset' in September 1969. Grimsby transported 30% of Danish butter for the UK in 1969.

In the mid-1960s 'Winston Churchill', and 'England' were added. 'England' was the first ro-ro ship in the North Sea, to Harwich in 1964. 'Surrey' sailed from 1970 at Grimsby.

MV Hero when carrying butter for Grimsby, sank in 1977, operating for EWL, owned by DFDS and Ellerman Lines. 'Stafford' sailed to North Shields from 1969, which first sailed in June 1967.

The Immingham route is now operated by 'Ark Dania' and 'Ark Germania', both built at Volkswerft in Stralsund former East Germany). The sailing takes 18.5 hours.

The freight route to North Shields stopped, but Esbjerg to Immingham is the main route from 1995, on the Tor Line until 2010, now known as DFDS Seaways.

In 1978, Anchor butter, of New Zealand, was the best-selling make of butter in the UK, but the EEC wanted to stop all imports of Anchor butter to the UK. Consumption of butter in the UK was around 400,000 tonnes, with around 100,000 tonnes of imported Anchor butter. Country Life butter was around 30,000 tonnes in 1977.

By the mid-1980s New Zealand was exporting around 25% of British butter requirements. The EC blocked exports of Anchor butter at no more than around 78,000 tonnes, a strategy that had been largely instigated by Austin Deasy of Ireland.

After the sinking of the Rainbow Warrior in July 1985, New Zealand released Alain Mafart and Dominique Prieur, in return for France allowing imports of Anchor butter into the UK, which France had agreed. Anchor butter was frozen in transit, and took five weeks to reach the UK.

Anchor Spreadable was introduced in 1991, the first of its kind. HM Customs and Excise claimed that this new product was not a natural butter, but a manufactured product. Imported butter had an import duty of around 35p per tub. HM Customs and Excise wanted 98p of import duty, but lost the case of New Zealand Milk Products in February 1999 in the High Court.

Lurpak Spreadable arrived in January 1997, but had nonetheless been sold in Denmark from April 1990.

From 1974 until the late 1990s, sales of butter worldwide declined. The EC published standards about butter in December 1994, No 2991/94.

Anchor butter was made from October 2001 by Arla Foods, when it bought the UK interests of New Zealand Milk. Fonterra dairy co-operative made Anchor butter elsewhere, also formed in 2001.

In the 2010s butter was now selling well, up 17% year on year. By 2011 Country Life butter produced 11% of British requirements; but around 75% of butter sold in the UK was imported. Lurpak, of Denmark, sold the best, providing 42% of British requirements.

=== Cheese ===
In 1938 the UK produced only 23% of its requirements for cheese, leading to heavy rationing in the Second World War.

In 1938 the UK imported 149,000 tons of cheese. Before being invaded in May 1940, the Netherlands produced 124,000 tons of cheese, and exported 58,000 tons; after the invasion, the Germans took all of the Dutch cheese, as well as the cream. In 1941 the UK was to receive 45% of the total cheese output of the US.

Bacteriologist Edward Capstick advised the Ministry of Food to direct the milk that was destined for cheese to be made in larger factories, which rapidly closed most of Britain's rural cheese industry. Cheese rationing began on May 5, 1941, at one ounce per week. Vegetarians could have eight ounces. Cheese rations could be bought for four weeks, at a time. Schools could serve cheese, as part of an 'Oslo dinner'. Pubs could not serve cheese.

The cheese ration increased to two ounces a week from June 30, 1941. Diabetics had an increased ration. The cheese ration was increased to three ounces in late August 1941. Dairy imports from the US, across the Atlantic, replaced the previous imports from British Empire countries.

Before the war, 3,500 tons of cheese, per week, was consumed, which had increased to 4,500 tons in 1951. Three-quarters of cheese was imported. The UK made around 52,000 tons a year of cheese before the war; in 1951 it was 44,000 tons. Around 1951 the cheese ration was briefly increased to three ounces per week, but was reduced to two ounces in April 1951. By late 1951, cheese was also still rationed in Norway. On April 20, 1952, the cheese ration was reduced to only one ounce per week.

Cheese, with butter, rationing finished on May 8, 1954. During the war, and up to May 1954, cheese production in factories increased by almost three times as much, from 1939. But production of regional cheeses, such as Double Gloucester, almost vanished. Most cheese was Cheddar or Cheshire. Of the regional cheeses, only Stilton kept going with enough production, due to its strong and robust level of exports. In 1954, 82,000 tons of cheese was made, with 41,000 tons of Cheddar, and 32,000 tons of Cheshire

By 1973 the UK produced 56% of British cheese requirements, and 75% by 1975.

By the early 1970s, half of the Cheddar cheese eaten in the UK was made in New Zealand and Australia. As the UK entered the EEC, these imports would be phased out, due to European trade restrictions. England produced 160,000 tons of cheese each year in 1972. Consumption of cheese in the UK increased 24% from 1974 to 1982 to 272,000 tonnes, with two-thirds of that Cheddar.

Lymeswold cheese was introduced in the south of England in October 1981, and across the UK in September 1982, due to an over-supply of milk. It was developed by Dairy Crest at Crudgington, and manufactured at Cannington in Somerset. By November 1982, the customer demand for the Lymeswold cheese was vastly bigger than the production from the Somerset factory. It was selling £5m a year in 1984, and outsold all other blue cheeses.

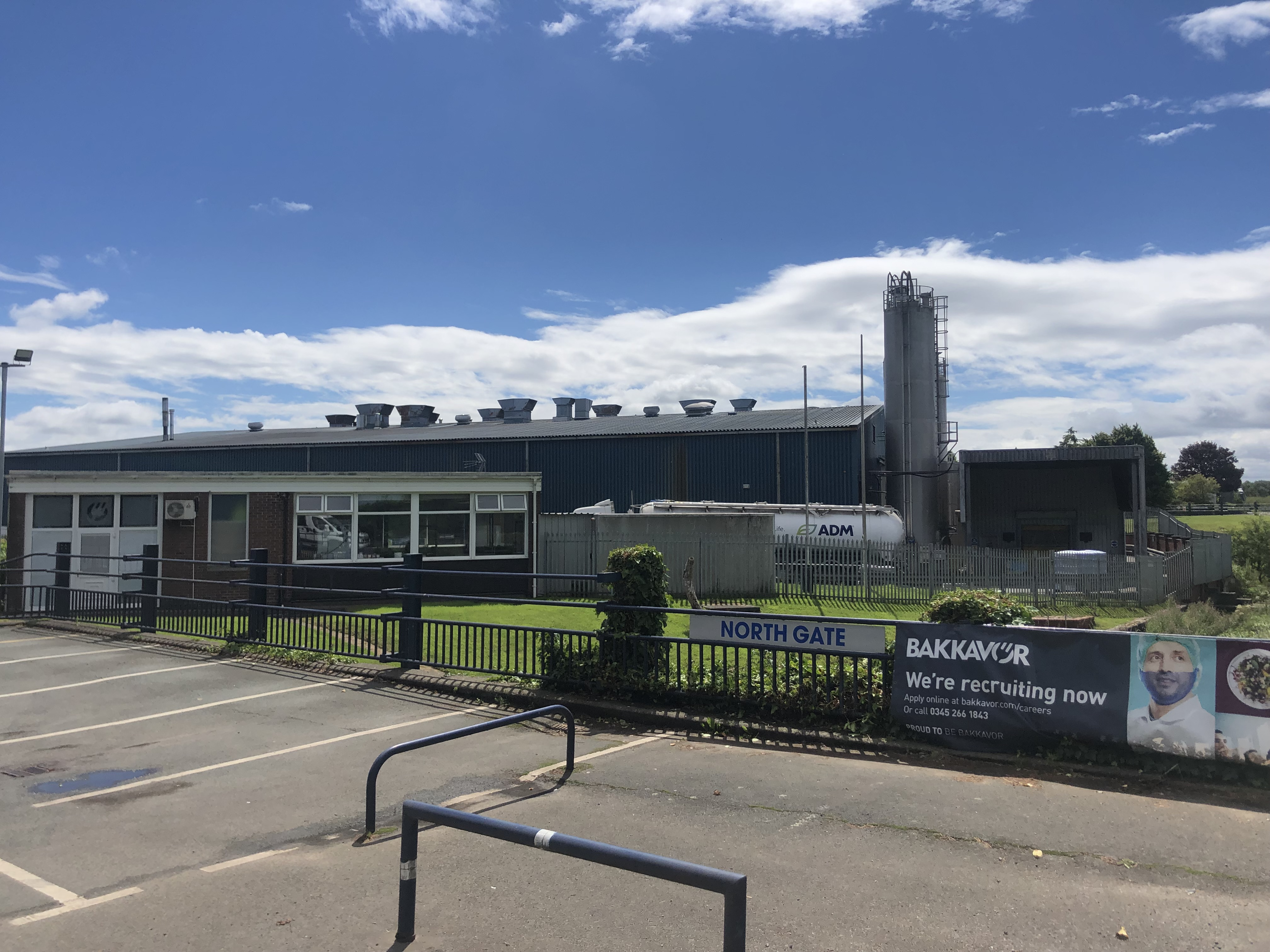
Cheshire Bakkavör site in July 2022

All was going well until Lymeswold production was moved to Aston by Wrenbury (Newhall, Cheshire), near Nantwich in Cheshire in April 1984, to make 4,000 tonnes per year. This would be equal to the annual British consumption of Stilton cheese, which was an optimistic sales figure, and four times the production of the former Cannington plant. There were technical difficulties in the product, and sales soon plummeted. Dairy Crest removed it in May 1992.

The Cheshire site was bought by New Primebake, in 1993 for £0.75m, who were later bought by Bakkavör in 2006. From September 1993, the site now makes 6 million garlic baguettes every week, with 70 tonnes of butter; nearly all garlic baguettes in British supermarkets are produced at that Cheshire site.

Fromage frais was introduced to the UK in 1988, when Anchor Foods teamed up with Gervais Danone, to sell Petit Danone in London and South East England. It was hoped to sell around £15m a year.

In the early 1990s the EC limited milk for British cheese manufacturers, with the result that the UK imported five times the amount of Cheddar that it exported.

In 1993 analogue pizza cheese was first discovered in the UK by Shropshire Trading Standards. This fraud is regulated by the Pizza, Pasta & Italian Food Association. Chris Elliott (food scientist) of Queen's University Belfast has led much research on food fraud in the UK. Pizza parlours are known vendors of substandard cheese.

The cheese and milk division of Unigate merged with Dairy Crest in July 2000.

In 2009 40% of cheddar sold in the UK was imported. Over the ten years to 2009, cheese imports had increased 60%. Cheese was also imported from Latvia.

In 2010, the Swiss ate the most cheese and butter, per person. The Finns drink the most milk, per person.

In 2018, 80% of Cheddar cheese imported into the UK came from the Republic of Ireland, worth £700m to Ireland. The Irish Dairy Industries Association wanted a helpful Brexit negotiation, as Ireland made 78,000 tonnes of cheddar, almost all for the UK. WTO tariffs, for cheddar cheese in 2017, were £1,434 per tonne.

In 2022 a third of UK milk was destined for making cheese; 70% of that cheese was Cheddar. Around 130,000 tonnes of cheese was exported.

In 2024 the EU made 9.833 million tonnes of cheese, mostly in France, Germany, Netherlands, Italy and Poland. The US made 6.466 million tonnes of cheese in 2024, with much made in Plymouth, Wisconsin. The average EU citizen consumed 20.75kg of cheese; in the UK it was 11.27kg. China is the world's largest importer of cheese.

Most mozzarella in the UK is made in Germany, such as by DMK Deutsches Milchkontor, but the two Leprino Foods mozzarella plants in North Wales and County Down, in Northern Ireland, are Europe's largest producer of mozzarella.

France makes four times as much cheese as the UK, and eat around three times as much.

=== Bottling ===
In 1922 Sir Robert Hutchison, 1st Baronet advocated the bottling of pasteurised milk, where possible, which largely began around 1924.

The technical adviser of United Dairies, until June 1945, was Percy Brook Tustin (1877– August 4 1947), succeeded by bacteriologist Edward Capstick (1899 - April 26 1963), who had worked in the Dairy division of the Ministry of Food throughout the war.

=== UHT milk ===
The UHT milk process was first developed in the UK. The UHT process was developed by Thomas Ashton (July 12, 1910 - December 17, 2002), the research director of Express Dairies, who also developed chocolate-flavoured milk, and fruit and chocolate-topped yoghurt. He helped found the Society of Dairy Technology in 1943.

Research was carried from 1956 at the Express Dairies research laboratory at Colindale. UHT milk equipment was developed by a company in Crawley. A test plant was developed on London Road in South Morden, under Clive Bishop, from around October 1963. Milk was taken to 275 degrees Fahrenheit for two seconds. Another plant at Manchester was built in early 1964. UHT commercial production began on Tuesday May 10, 1966 at South Morden.

UHT milk was first sold from October 1965, when known as 'long keeping milk', later known as long life milk.

UHT milk was first made in Scotland in January 1968 by Scottish Milk at Hogganfield Creamery, under the 'Scottish Pride' name.

France drinks 95% UHT milk, and Germany drinks 70%.

=== Pasteurisation ===
The German chemist Franz von Soxhlet was the first to propose pasteurised milk, in 1886. The International Congress on Tuberculosis was held in London in July 1901, where Robert Koch gave a speech. The National Clean Milk Society held a National Milk Conference each year to discuss pasteurisation; representatives from Canada, Sweden, and the Netherlands attended. Attending in 1922 were Sir Stewart Stockman, Charles Bathurst, 1st Viscount Bledisloe, Nathan Raw, Danish Georges Dreyer and Sir Arthur Griffith-Boscawen, who discussed the recent work of the French bacteriologist Albert Calmette. The conference in November 1926 was attended by the Minister for Health, Neville Chamberlain.

But by 1932, pasteurisation was viewed as a 'retrograde step'. Manchester City Corporation wanted to enforce pasteurisation in Manchester.

By 1934, other Empire countries were largely pasteurising their milk; any butter arriving here would have been pasteurised. The Society of Medical Officers of Health, the Food Education Society and BMA advocated pasteurization. The Milk Nutrition Committee was formed in the late 1930s. By 1938, 98% of milk in London was pasteurised. In November 1938 the Milk Industry Bill was tabled, but the proposals were quite demanding, with some people describing it similar to the Munich Agreement; it would mean no unpasteurised milk in some areas. Sir Edward Ruggles-Brise, of Essex, and Sir Hugh O'Neill, the Chairman of the 1922 Committee, wanted the Milk Industry Bill removed, which happened in late February 1939.

In late March 1939, the British Association held a science conference that discussed 'Milk in its Nutritional and Allied Aspects', with microbiologist Harriette Chick, and nutritional biochemist Jack Drummond.

The Milk Industry Bill was reissued by minister Sir Reginald Dorman-Smith in late June 1939, with compulsory pasteurisation. By 1942 the US and Canada had compulsory pasteurisation.

In late November 1948, the Milk (Special Designations) Bill was introduced by Labour minister Edith Summerskill, which would in effect introduce compulsory pasteurisation. It passed the third reading on April 29 1949, and cleared the House of Lords on May 20 1949. It was given Royal Assent on May 31 1949. First order for pasteurisation as given on October 1 1951, for London. The Milk Testing Service was discontinued in 1963.

The Queen and the Prince of Wales regularly drank unpasteurised milk from their own herd of Jersey cows in the 1990s. The Prince of Wales launched his own unpasteurised Single Gloucester cheese in November 1995.

Stilton was partly made with unpasteurised milk until 1989, but this was stopped due to a Listeriosis outbreak; this outbreak was from Swiss Vacherin Mont d'Or cheese instead. Until around 2018, much French Camembert and Brie, protected in its origins by the Institut national de l'origine et de la qualité (INAO), was made with unpasteurised milk; around a quarter of French cheese was unpasteurised.

On August 1 1983 unpasteurised milk was banned in Scotland anywhere, by the Milk-Based Drink (Hygiene and Heat Treatment) (Scotland) Regulations 1983. Around 1980 unpasteurised milk was banned in England supermarkets, but it can be sold elsewhere, as green top milk. It is not sold anywhere in Ireland from 2006, or Australia. Ireland is protected by the Health Protection Surveillance Centre and Food Safety Authority of Ireland.

In September 1997 the Advisory Committee on the Microbiological Safety of Food advised that raw milk be banned in England Wales. In October 1997, the Codex Alimentarius Commission looked at banning unpasteurised milk. Raw milk in the UK is represented by the Raw Milk Producers Association.

Consumption of raw milk has increased, as pasteurisation decreases vitamins B1, B2, B12, C, E and folate; but only vitamin B2 is of any significant proportion in milk.

=== Cream ===
Cream production was completely stopped on October 1 1940.

Cream was sold once more from May 9 1951, for seven weeks, but was stopped from early July 1951. Cream was sold again from April 1 1953 to be sold until late July 1953, and was continued from July 1953, as supplies were thought to be now sufficient.

In the 1960s, cream cakes were not that intrinsically popular, but by the 1970s, half of the cream produced in the UK was for baked products.

Anchor Food Products, of Swindon, introduced aerosol cream, a form of whipped cream, in September 1982.

Häagen-Dazs has been produced at Tilloy-lès-Mofflaines in northern France, near Arras, since December 1992, and exports to 90 countries, with the Arras Technical Center, built in 2022. Häagen-Dazs was owned by Grand Met from 1989, which became Diageo, from December 1997, until being sold in 2001. The milk is sourced from Ingredia at Ligny-Saint-Flochel, fifteen miles away, with sugar from Tereos. Häagen-Dazs has zero artificial ingredients. Häagen-Dazs has around 10% of ice-cream in France, but Unilever has 20%; Unilever operates under the Miko (ice cream) name, at Saint-Dizier in north-east France.

=== Yoghurt ===
Yoghurt is mainly produced with Lactobacillus delbrueckii subsp. bulgaricus, discovered by Stamen Grigorov, with Streptococcus thermophilus. Streptococcus thermophilus is also largely responsible for Mozzarella cheese.

Eden Vale, of Express Dairies, started largely around 1964, with yoghurt and cream. Ski Yoghurt started in Haywards Heath in Sussex; Express bought the company, Swiss Milk Products Ltd, around 1964, and moved production to a purpose-built site Cheshire, next to the A49. This site was the first purpose-built yoghurt plant in the UK. In 1973, such was the demand for Ski yoghurt that Express Dairies could not source enough plastic yoghurt pots, and had to fly yoghurt pots from France. Unigate sold its yoghurt under the St Ivel name.

Danone of France, which was Europe's largest dairy company, was formed in 1967, and sold its yoghurt in the UK from the late 1960s; this largely introduced fruit yoghurts to the UK. Until the late 1960s, yoghurt was mostly viewed as an obscure health food. In June 1970 Danone began heavily advertising its yoghurt, largely at women aged 18-34, in the AB social group. Danone in the UK in the 1990s operated from Hemel Hempstead. £14m of total yoghurt was sold in the UK in 1971. Denmark consumed ten times as much yoghurt per person than the UK. VAT was charged on yoghurt, but not milk.

Nestlé bought the Chambourcy yoghurt in 1978; Chambourcy Foods was the British division.

Yoplait, of France, formed a joint-venture with Dairy Crest and Sodiaal in September 1991. Raine's Dairy Foods, of Essex, was sold to Yoplait in 1998 for £66m.

152,000 tonnes of yoghurt was sold in the UK in 1984, £155m; 250,000 tonnes was sold in 1991; and around 300,000 tonnes was sold in 1995, over £500m.

In 1994, the UK consumed 5.3kg yoghurt per person, but in the Netherlands it was 20.7kg, in France it was 17.3kg, in Germany it was 11.3kg and in Italy it was 5.0kg.

Yakult, which is not yoghurt, was sold from 1996. Probiotic yoghurt began being sold in significant quantities from around 2005.

Nestlé bought the Ski yoghurt enterprise, and the Fromage Frais division of Eden Vale, on 31 January 2002; Ski yoghurt had 11% of British yoghurt consumption; Müller had 30%. Eden Vale had been bought iFebruary 1992, and sold again in May 2004 for £16.5m.

Danone, of France, bought the yoghurts division of Dairy Crest in August 2002 for £32.5m, from Uniq, including Shape yoghurt.

By 2004, Yeo Valley Organic sold the second-largest amount of yoghurt in the UK; Danone sold twice as much.

Dairy Crest sold its 49% ownership of Yoplait in March 2009 for £63m. Yoplait was formed in 1964, and by 2010 was the world's second-largest dairy company. Yoplait had five factories in France, and others in pain, Poland and the Czech Republic.

In 2010, 40% of yoghurt sold in the UK was made in France or Belgium. Onken has been made in Moers, on the western edge of Germany, by Emmi AG of Switzerland.

Danone Activia is made in Ferrières-en-Bray in the Seine-Maritime department of France. Yoplait invented fruit yoghurt in 1967 and drinking yoghurt in 1974, and is made in Monéteau mostly, and also in Le Mans and Vienne, Isère.

=== Effect of the European Community ===
Until early 1983 the UK had banned any imports of liquid milk, which was mostly economically possible with UHT milk only. The European Commission disputed this, and took the case to the European Court, which decided on February 8 1983 that the UK could not do this. France drank a lot less liquid milk than the UK. The Importation of Milk Act 1983 was passed to allow UHT imports.

EEC milk quotas arrived in April 1984, which cut production by 9%.

== Production sites ==
=== Scotland ===
- Bridge of Allan, Stirlingshire, run by Graham's The Family Dairy, at the end of the M9, directly on the A9, opposite the west side of the University of Stirling, near the playing field; known for its Jersey cattle milk products, known as gold-top milk, with a yoghurt site in Nairn
- Nestlé Girvan, off the A77 on Grangestone Industrial Estate on the Scottish west coast in South Ayrshire since 1979, it supplies factories at York and Halifax, and previously at Fawdon, with milk supplied from Ayrshire; it makes 20,000 tonnes of milk chocolate crumb, per year; it made Blue Riband (biscuits) until 2017. Nestlé closed a similar plant at Mallow, County Cork in 2006.
- Lochaben, two miles west of Lockerbie, Dumfriesshire, north of the A709, on the west side of the River Annan; former Independent Dairies in the 1950s, former Milk Link now Arla since 2012, the largest dairy plant in Scotland, it makes cheddar cheese. On the afternoon of Friday July 4, 1975, the Queen and Duke of Edinburgh toured the Express Dairy Foods Factory, with the chairman of the Express Dairy Company, J Travers Clarke. It makes 42,000 tonnes of cheese per year.

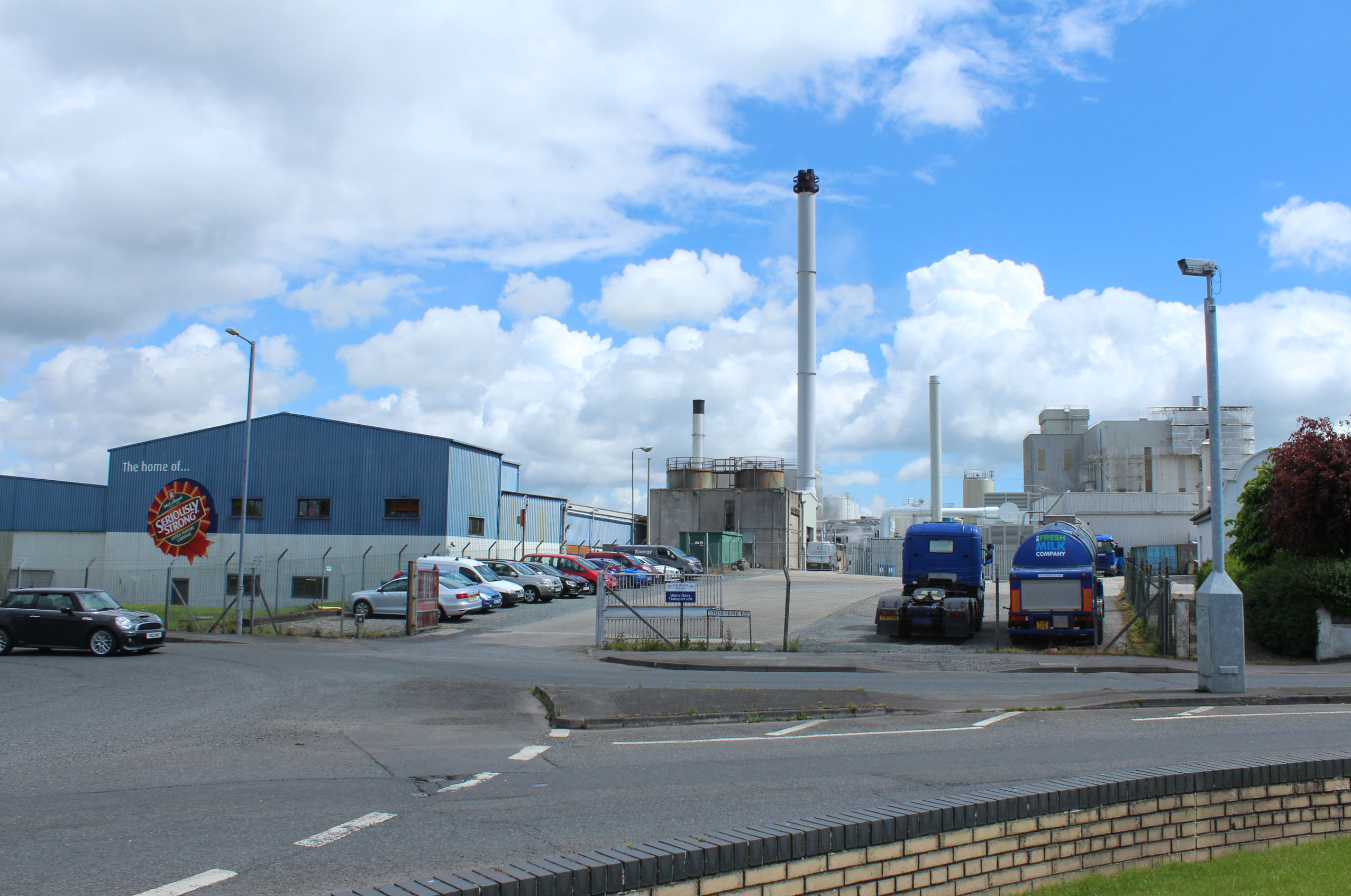
Stranraer Creamery on the A77 road, seen in May 2017

- Stranraer, Dumfries & Galloway, makes 'Seriously Spreadable' soft cheddar cheese, formerly McLelland, bought by Lactalis (Nestlé) in 2005, known as the Caledonian Cheese Company; the Princess Royal opened the extended Galloway Creamery, partly owned by Unigate and the Scottish Co-operative Wholesale Society, on Friday October 4, 1991, later bought by McLelland and Sons in 1995, then Lactalis in 2005

=== Wales ===
- Chwilog, South Caenarfon Creameries, opened by the Prince of Wales, and his wife, on Tuesday July 5, 2016
- Felinfach, Ceredigion, on the former Lampeter, Aberayron and New Quay Light Railway, on the A482 north-west of Lampeter, a former Volac large site, making ingredients for sports nutrition products, bought by Arla Foods Ingredients in 2024
- Glanyrafon, Ceredigion, east of Llanbadarn, owned by Rachel's Organic, known for organic yoghurt, started in 1984 by Rachel Roberts, the daughter of Dinah Williams, who was a colleague of Lady Eve Balfour, the niece of Arthur Balfour, and known for the Haughley Experiment in Suffolk in 1939. Visited by the Prince of Wales, a known connoisseur and advocate of organic food products, on Tuesday July 28, 1998, followed by a visit to the Pwllpeira‌‌n Upland Research‌‌ Centre at Cwmystwyth. An ardent consumer of organic food, the Prince of Wales visited the organic yoghurt factory again, on Monday July 10, 2017, to open a new extension. It now makes the rest of Nestlé yoghurt, including Ski yoghurt

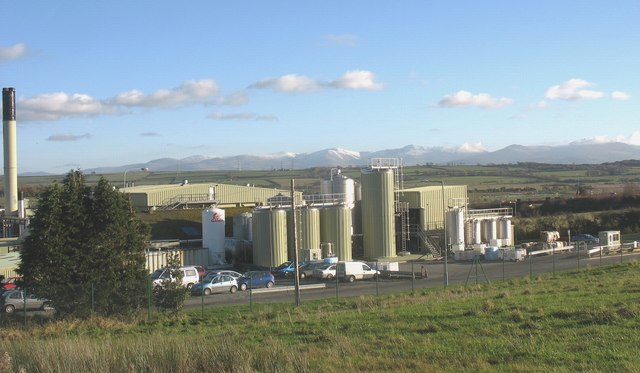
The Glanbia Cheese mozzarella plant in December 2008

- Llangefni, in central Anglesey, sold to Cadbury in February 1954, for Cadbury Dairy Milk chocolate former Dairy Crest site which planned to close in March 1988, but was bought by Golden Dairies in June 1988 as a cheese plant. Leprino Foods, formerly owned by Glanbia Cheese, US-owned, with the Northern Ireland plant, both sites make a third of all UK cheese exports, and both are Europe's largest producer of mozzarella, with headquarters in Rudheath in Cheshire
- Pembrokeshire Creamery, opened in July 2024; from 2019 to 2024 Wales had no large-scale milk processing site; milk previously had to be taken to Gloucestershire, off the M5
- Wrexham, former Ash Manor Cheese, bought by Dale Farm, of Northern Ireland, in February 2014, a cheese packing plant

=== Northern Ireland ===
- Artigarvan, County Tyrone, Lakeland Dairies, a former Leckpatrick site until 2019, near Strabane, on the Irish border
- Ballycarry, County Antrim
- Ballymena, Pennybridge Industrial Estate, the plant was built in 1977, with a £1m UHT milk plant built from around 1982, and now makes cream and custard, with the group technical centre
- Ballyrashane, near Coleraine, Lakeland Dairies
- Coleraine, Dairy Produce Packers (DPP), opened as Bengers in 1948, then Fisons in 1958, and Express Foods in 1987, becoming part of RHM, and in 1989 became part of Golden Vale of Cork - Leckpatrick Dairies. It won the 1996 Queen's Award for Exports. A significant processed cheese manufacturer, it supplies Subway across Europe, and all cheese slices for McDonald's in the UK, Ireland, northern France (40% of France), Denmark and Finland came from this plant in the 1990s, and the Coleraine site has supplied to all of Sweden, Belgium and the Netherlands. It produced 614 million cheese slices for McDonald's UK sites in 2010. It is the largest producer of processed cheese in the UK. The joint venture was bought by Golden Vale in April 1993
- Cullybackey, butter, three miles north of Ballymena in County Antrim
- Dunmanbridge, County Tyrone, cheddar cheese plant
- County Tyrone, Fivemiletown Creamery, opened in April 1972, since 2014 owned by the Dale Farm cooperative, visited by the Prince of Wales on Tuesday May 16, 2006
- Magheralin in County Down, off the A3, from the M1 motorway (Northern Ireland) junction 9; opened by the Bovril Group on May 11, 1948, and cost £250,000, it made Cheddar cheese. The Bovril Creamery, Maralin, was opened by Robert Moore. Cheese production began in 1951, from 6m gallons of milk; all of Northern Ireland needed 10m gallons per year, to make cheese. 9 tons of cheese was made per day in 1961, being about five tons of Cheshire and five tons of Cheddar. This was the first large-scale cheese factory in Northern Ireland; staff had visited Somerset and Dorset, to see how cheese-making worked. Cheese was rationed in Northern Ireland, at one ounce per head, amounting to 140 tons per month for all of Northern Ireland. Robert McVeigh was the factory manager. Home Office minister Sir Hugh Lucas-Tooth visited in August 1952. It employed 170 in the winter and 220 in the summer. Magheralin made creamed rice from May 1965; at first production would be 150 tins per minute. A new plant was opened in April 1965 by Harry West, with Ian Lawson Johnston, 2nd Baron Luke, the chairman of Bovril Ltd. 1m gallons of milk was required per year, to make 7,000 tons of Ambrosia Creamed Rice pudding. Metal Box, of Portadown, would supply 50,000 cans per day. The site was later owned by Express Foods from 1973, being bought by Glanbia Cheese in November 2000. Leprino Foods (US), makes mozzarella, with another mozzarella plant in North Wales

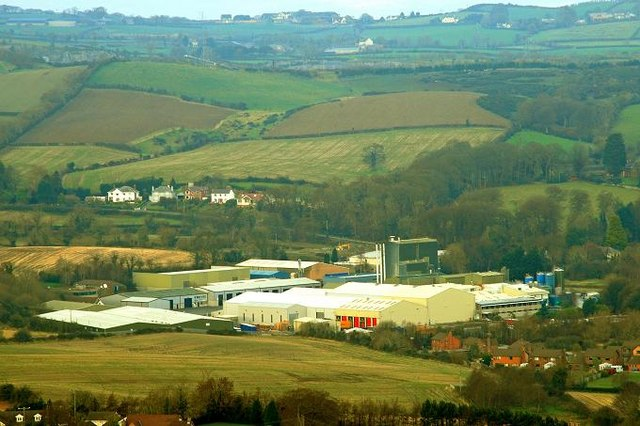
Newtownards in December 2008

- Newtownards, County Down, run by Lakeland Dairies, of County Cavan, visited by the Princess Royal on Wednesday September 5, 2018
- Portadown, County Armagh, Coleraine Cheddar, it moved from Coleraine in 1994

=== North East England ===
- Team Valley, Kavli, of Norway, started at Cramlington in 1936, founded by Knut Kavli (1890–1965), also making crispbread; it moved to Gateshead in January 1940; the current site opened in 1958; by the early 1970s the Gateshead site could not make enough Primula cheese; it made 25m a year in the 1980s, increasing production by 40% from 1982 to 1987; it had 20% of cheese spread production in the UK in 1987, but was the UK's main producer, as a Merseyside cheese spread plant closed in the early 1980s; Gouda cheese and Edam cheese arrived from the Netherlands, France and Germany.

=== Yorkshire and the Humber ===
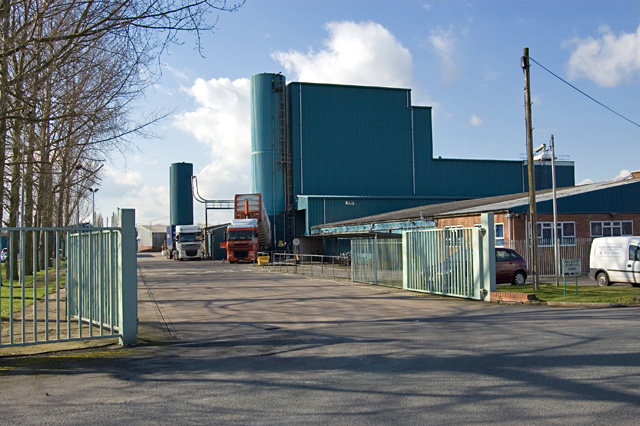
Holme-on-Spalding-Moor in March 2009

- Boroughbridge, Payne's Dairies
- Hade Edge near Holmfirth, Longley Farm
- Holme-on-Spalding-Moor, Station Lane, the site also produced condensed milk, made by Northern Dairies from October 1937; it makes chocolate crumb, and condensed milk for the confectionery industry, and soft cheese, now owned by Meadow Foods, in the east of the village, off the A163

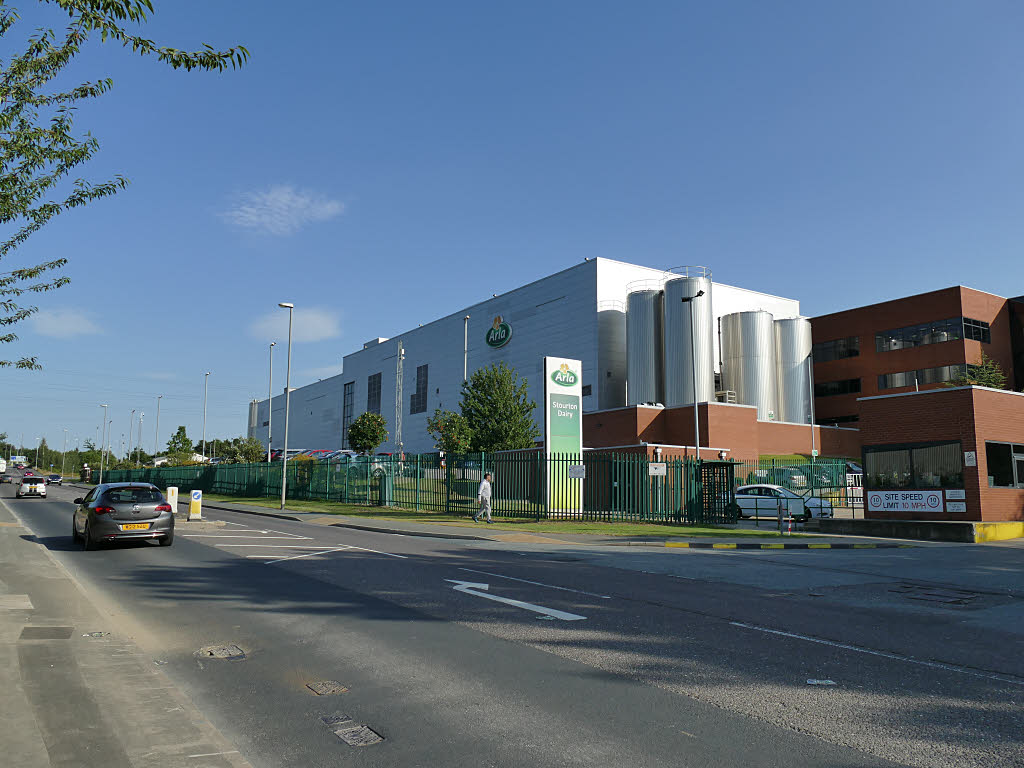
Arla Stourton in July 2019

- Stourton, north of junction 44 of the M1, the third-biggest dairy in UK, after Arla Aylesbury and Müller Droitwich, it opened around October 2004, the headquarters of Arla UK

=== North West England ===
- Appleby-in-Westmorland, situated in the Eden Valley in Cumbria, so giving the name to Eden Valley Foods, when owned by Eden Dairy UK Ltd, formerly Express Dairies, it was opened by Express Dairies in 1959 at a cost of £750,000; it was visited by Princess Anne on Monday July 1, 1985, and the Prince of Wales on Tuesday April 11, 2017.
- Aspatria, north-west Cumbria, the Lake District Creamery makes cheddar cheese, former Dairy Crest

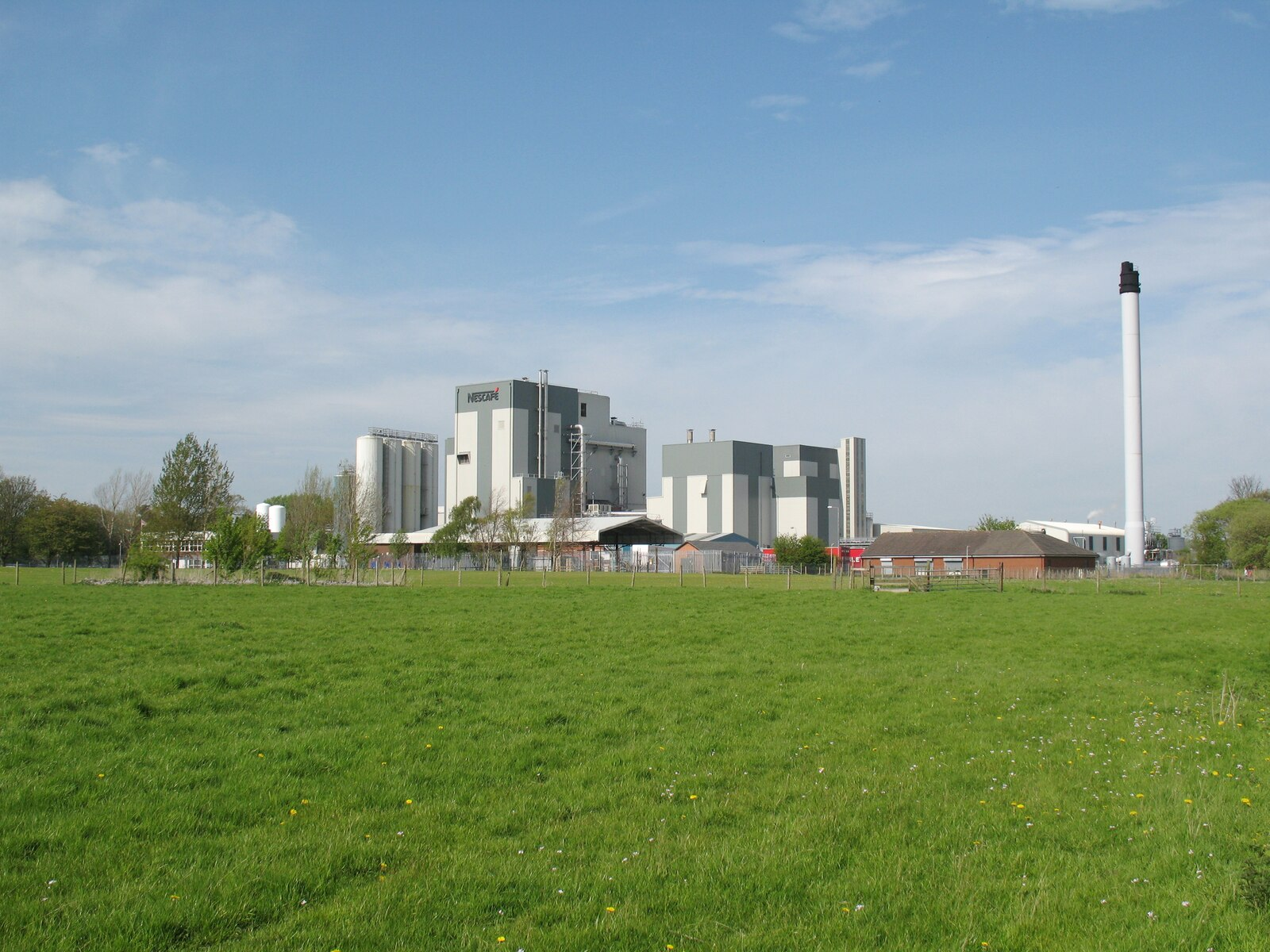
Dalston factory in May 2018

- Nestlé Dalston, since 1992 the site has made packets of coffee mixes, powdered milk, and Coffee-Mate, on the B5299 south of Carlisle at Dalston, Cumbria; the factory opened in 1962, built from April 1961, costing £250,000
- Kirkby in Merseyside, off the A5207, on the east side of junction 4 of the M57 motorway, on the north side of the East Lancashire Road; was St Ivel (Unigate) had a smaller depot on the Stockpit Road Industrial Estate, until in July 1996, when Unigate bought a 53-acre plant on Moorgate Road, of Kraft Jacobs Suchard, for £77m, which had opened in 1957. The site was bought by Kraft in November 1954, on the East Lancashire Road, next to an ICI factory, to replace its site at Hayes in Middlesex. Philadelphia Cream Cheese production began in 1960. Cheese production moved to Bad Fallingbostel in Germany and to Namur in Belgium in 1983. Dairylea (cheese) is today made in Namur in Belgium. 900 workers had left the former Kirkby plant in 1983. St Ivel spreads production was moved from Hemyock, in Devon, at the end of 1998. Dairy Crest later bought the St Ivel Spreads division in October 2002 for £86m from Uniq. The Kirkby site has made Country Life butter since the Crudgington plant closed in 2014.

Kirkland in January 2009

- Kirkland, Lancashire, near Garstang, Dewlay Cheesemakers, built their own wind turbine, and visited by the Prince Wales on March 21 2017
- Knutsford, Cheshire, Delamere Dairy, named after Delamere Forest, in Bexton, in the south-west of Knutsford; founded in 1985, known for its UHT milk, often found in most supermarkets
- Müller Manchester, opened by Robert Wiseman in August 1995, built on a former Esso distribution depot on Moseley Road in Trafford Park, costing £12m

Müller Manchester in September 2011

- Marlston-cum-Lache, south of Chester, next to the A483 junction with the A55; the former site of Bodfari Foods, who had another site at Stretton Tilston, which closed, after being bought in July 1992
- Rochdale, Lancashire Dairies, yoghurt
- Worleston, south Cheshire, makes Pilgrims Choice cheddar for Ornua Foods; the cheddar cheese was previously made in Wincanton in Somerset in the 1990s, and also made by North Downs Dairy at Bobbing Hill in Bobbing, Kent

=== East Midlands ===
- Corby, Northamptonshire on the Earlstrees Industrial Estate, Emmi Desserts, former Mademoiselle Desserts, and previously Speciality Desserts in Wellingborough, make patisseries for the foodservice industry
- Cropwell Bishop, south-east Nottinghamshire, on the western edge of the Vale of Belvoir; was Somerset Creameries in the 1990s, makes Shropshire Blue cheese, and Beauvale blue cheese
- Long Clawson, Leicestershire; the Prince of Wales, and his wife, visited in January 2011, followed by a Stilton cheese production site in nearby Melton Mowbray
- Newark-on-Trent, Bakkavör Desserts, it claims to be the biggest chilled desserts factory in the world, with 1,800 staff; Cypriot Andreas Liveras set up Laurens Patisseries in 1992, which also moved to Newark, in 1993, being bought by Bakkavör in 2006 for £130m.
- Saxelbye, north Leicestershire, Webster's
- Nestlé Tutbury, mostly a coffee plant, in South Derbyshire, on the A511 road next to Tutbury and Hatton railway station; from 2006 it has made 25m Dolce Gusto capsules a week which contain milk, with 90% exported to 38 countries, including the US and Mexico; with the Nestlé plant in Girana, in Spain, it is one of the two main European production sites for Dolce Gusto capsules.
- Upton, Leicestershire, off the A444 in western Leicestershire, Sparkenhoe Red Leicester, from unpasteurised milk

=== West Midlands ===
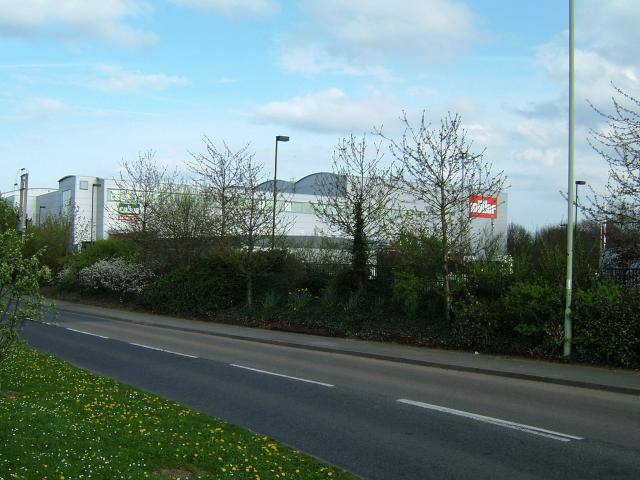
Müller in Shropshire in April 2005

- Donnington Wood in Telford, another plant of Müller yoghurt, 24 acres, bought in 2014 from NÖM Dairy of Austria, part of the Austrian Raiffeisen Banking Group, the £40m site opened in 2009
- Droitwich, Müller, the second-biggest dairy in the UK after Arla Aylesbury, opened by Robert Wiseman, of East Kilbride, in late April 2001; construction started on the 77-acre plant, in March 2000, costing £35m, at Stonebridge Cross Business Park
- Hawkstone, Shropshire, the Prince of Wales visited on March 1 1995.
- Knighton, Stafford, the Knighton Factory, situated on the Shropshire boundary, with High Offley directly to the east, for North Shropshire or south Cheshire. It was opened in 1911 by Cadbury. It made condensed milk in the 1910s. A new £500,000 factory opened in 1965. It makes powdered milk, and made Marvel (food) from 1965, owned by Cadbury Typhoo in the late 1970s, and made the Cadbury's Chocolate Break drink from 1985. There was a £2.5m explosion at 9.15pm on Thursday 17 April 1986 in the Coffee Compliment plant. It was fined £1,000 by Eccleshall magistrates in January 1987. It had a management buyout in 1986, who were bought by Hillsdown Holdings in May 1989.
- Leek, Staffordshire, Ornua Foods has packed Pilgrim's Choice cheese, since 2010; previously it was packed in Wincanton in Somerset; a butter plant was opened by Frederick Adams in 1925, and the new factory opened in 1975
- Market Drayton, north-east Shropshire, Müller yoghurts, opened a butter plant in 2014. Müller arrived on the Tern Valley Business Park at the end of 1991. It would produce 300 million pots of yoghurt and rice desserts a year. It would cost £14m. It would consume 50 million litres of milk per year. The site opened in July 1992. The distribution centre was built at Prees Heath from 1993. By 1999 the site employed 800. By 2000 it had 31% of the UK yoghurt production, and was the UK's fourth largest grocery producer, after Coca Cola, Walker's Crisps and Nescafé. It was the UK's sixth largest retail product after Coca Cola, Walker's Crisps, Nescafé, Stella Artois and Persil. The German ambassador Hans-Friedrich von Ploetz visited the plant in April 2002.
- Marlbrook, Herefordshire, in Hope under Dinmore and Newton, Hampton Court, directly on the A49, next to the Welsh Marches line; it has made products for Cadbury Dairy Milk, since the 1930s

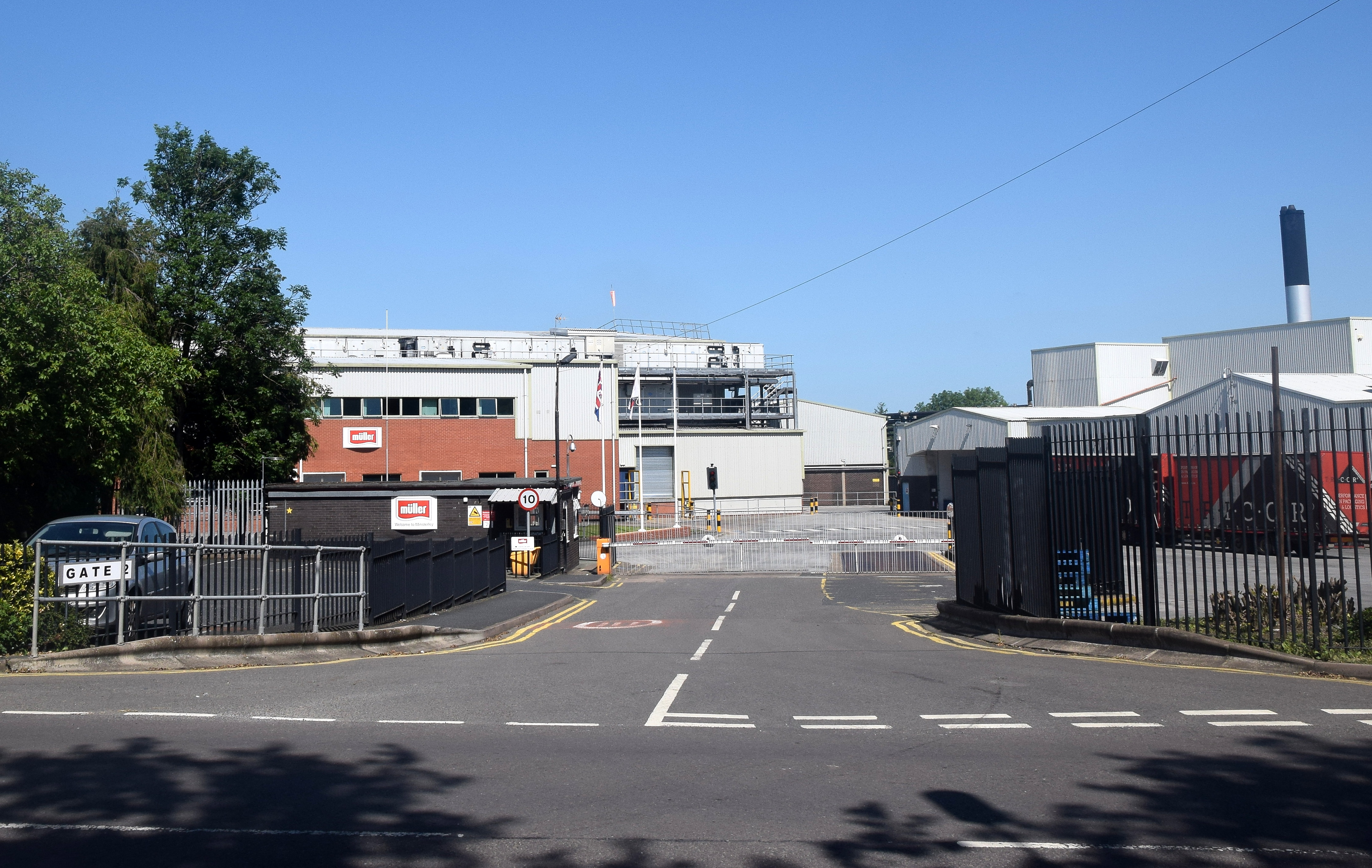
Minsterley Dairy in July 2021

- Minsterley, west Shropshire, directly on A488, south-west of Shrewsbury, next to the former Minsterley branch line; it made condensed milk in the 1930s and was owned by Independent Dairies in the 1950s, later Express Dairies as a butter plant from the 1960s and much expanded around 1964 by Express, it made Fromage Frais, from 1990; it won awards for its M&S lemon curd thick and creamy yogurt in 2003; it makes chilled desserts for Sainsbury's and M&S; it has been in constant operation since 1906, Cadbury chilled desserts are made here. A former Eden Vale site that made Ski yoghurt, and desserts, 26 acres, sold to Uniq in May 2004
- Nuneaton, £33m site, built from 1999 on Walsingham Drive in Bermuda Park, with the Dairy Crest distribution site, and cheese packing
- Oswestry, in the south-east, off the A483 bypass, Arla cheese packing plant
- Whitchurch, Shropshire, north Shropshire, Belton Cheese, was St Ivel

=== East of England ===
- Peterborough, Fengate, Nene Valley Foods, opened a £3m plant in April 1999, formed from Horrell's Dairies in 1993; bought by Meadow Foods in 2009.

=== South East England ===
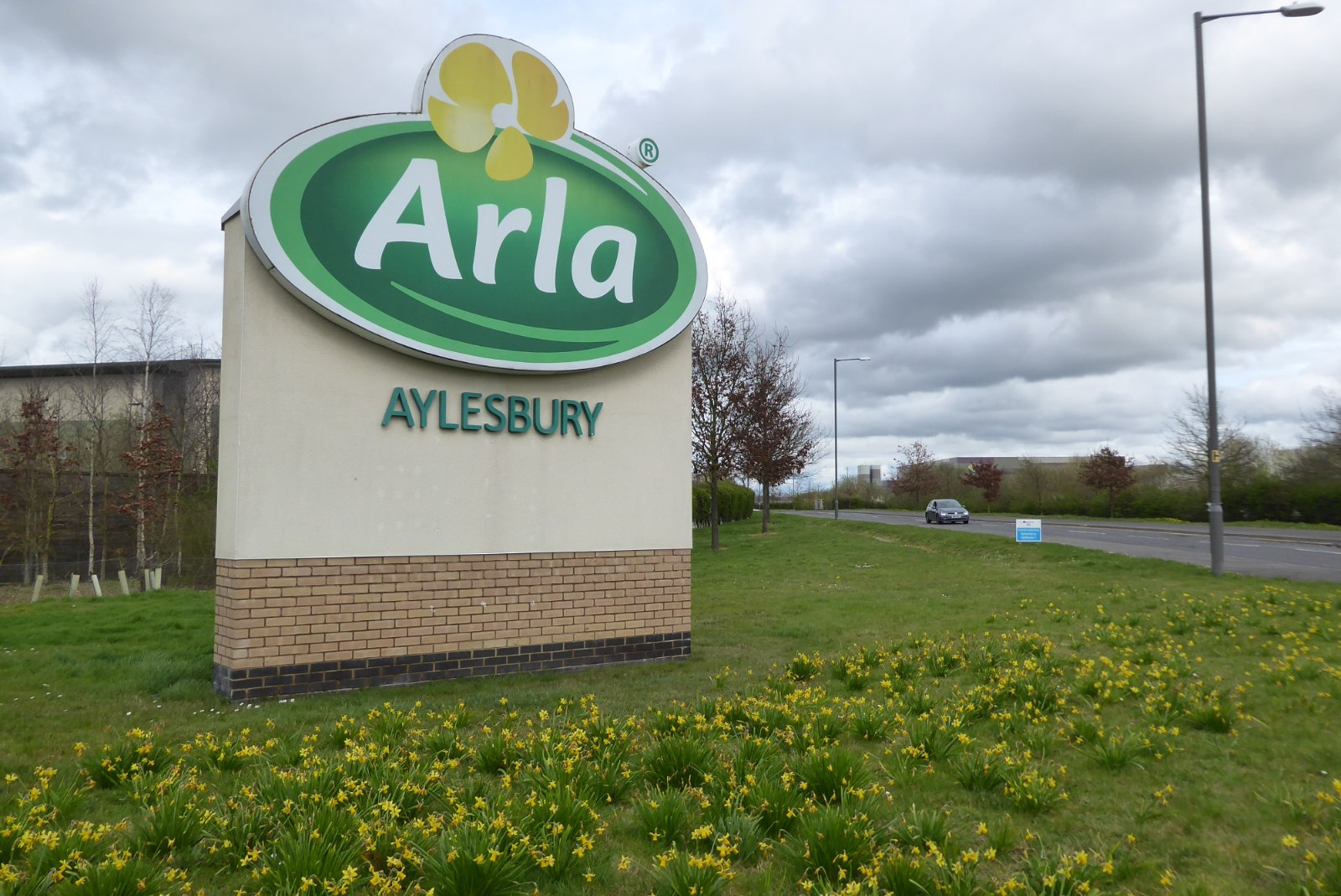
Arla Aylesbury entrance in March 2024

- Arla Aylesbury, Buckinghamshire off the A41, produces 10% of the UK's milk, and the world's largest milk production site

=== South West England ===
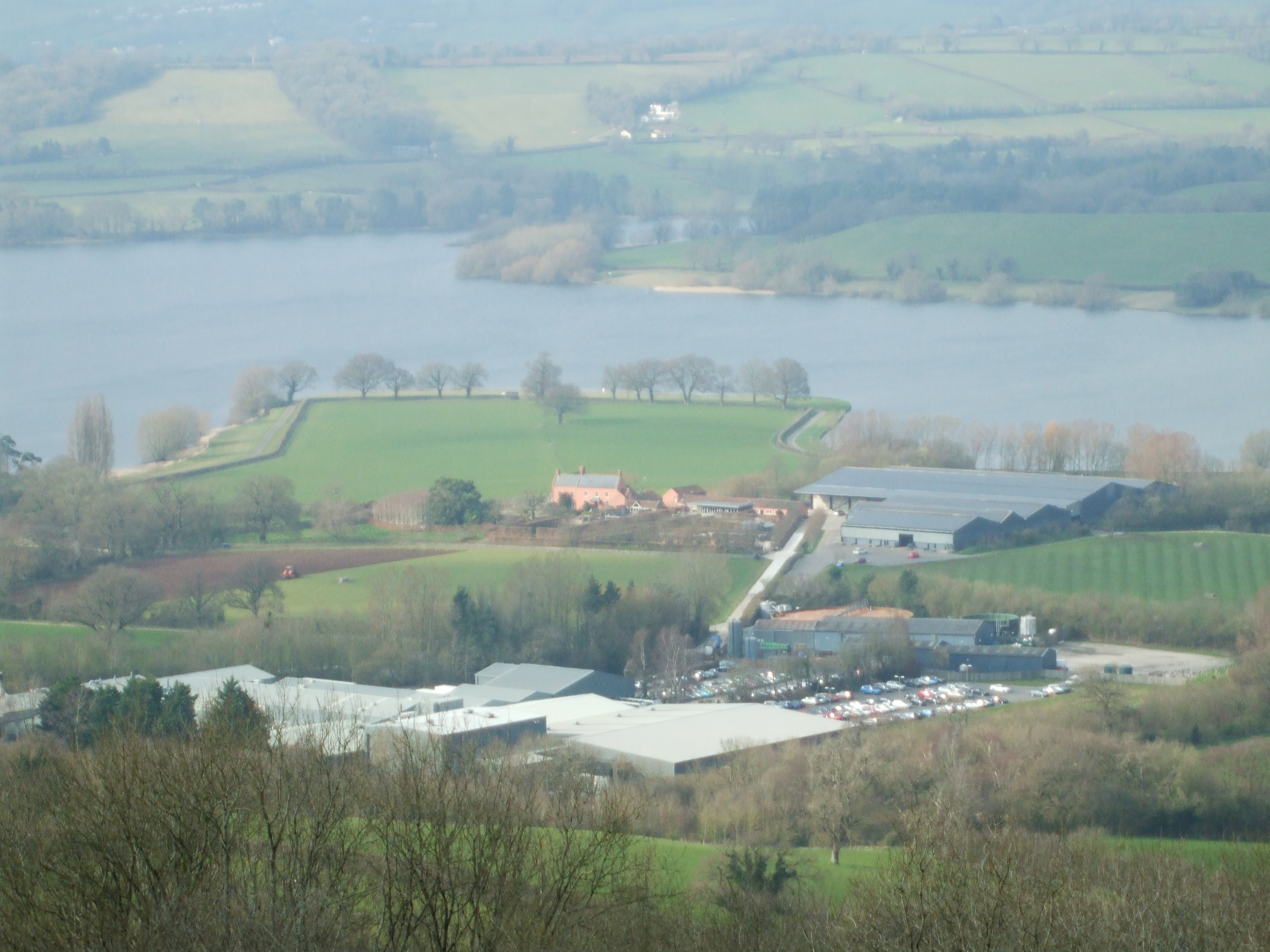
Blagdon Yeo Valley factory in March 2021

- Batcombe, Somerset, was in the former Mendip District, Westcombe Cheese
- Blagdon, north Somerset, Yeo Valley, made yoghurt in the 1980s, visited by the Queen and the Duke of Edinburgh on the morning of Friday July 20 2007, arriving at Yatton railway station, and visited by Sophie, Duchess of Edinburgh on the afternoon of Thursday April 17 2024
- Cannington, Somerset, west of the M5, former Dairy Crest Cannington Creamery, made soft cheese, now Yeo Valley Organic yoghurt; started around 1999, it won the Queen's Award for Sustainable Development in 2001; visited by the Duchess of Gloucester in July 14 2004

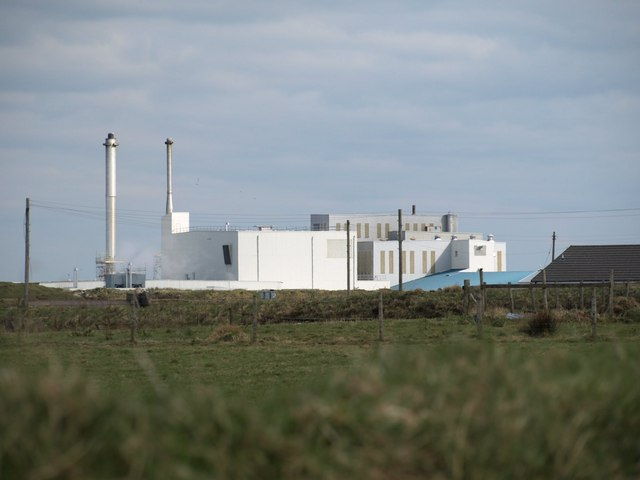
Davidstow Creamery in March 2008

- Crediton, Devon, opened by Express Dairies in 1963, sold to Milk Link in July 2002, which became Arla in 2012, and is now an independent company; it made UHT in the 1990s, making UHT milk from the late 1960s, it was the main Express Dairies UHT manufacturing centre, with over 50m litres of UHT products a year, when it opened it also made cream, butter and chocolate crumb; it produced 50,000 gallons of pasteurised milk every day in 1990, with 73m litres of UHT products a year; in 1996 it was the largest UHT plant in England and Wales; Kirkcudbright in Scotland was another UHT plant, until 2010; in July 2002 Express Dairies sold the UHT plant, and Kirkcudbright, to Milk Link for £33.1m; Crediton sells its own UHT as 'Dairy Pride' in supermarkets
- Cricket St Thomas, south Somerset, towards Dorset, home of Lubborn soft cheese, bought by Lactalis (Nestlé) in 2009; production was formerly at Crewkerne from 1983; a £6m creamery was opened by the Prince of Wales on July 4, 2003
- Davidstow Creamery, north-east Cornwall, Britain's largest cheese factory, producing Cathedral City cheddar cheese
- Daylesford Organic, at Daylesford, Gloucestershire on the A436 in the north-east Cotswolds, founded by Carole Bamford, the wife of the owner of JCB, at Daylesford House
- Devizes, Wiltshire, Hopton Industrial Estate, Bakkavör Desserts, now Greencore, former Hayden's Bakery until 2018, 500 staff, makes patisserie cakes and chilled desserts for M&S

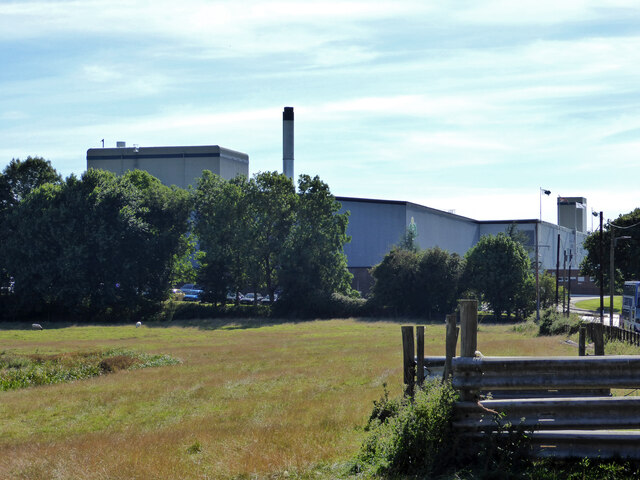
Taw Valley Creamery in August 2016

- Ditcheat, south of Shepton Mallet in Somerset, Barber's, makes mature cheddar cheese, visited by Sophie, Countess of Wessex on Wednesday March 21, 2012
- Dymock, western Gloucestershire, off the M50, close to Herefordshire, Charles Martell and Son makes Stinking Bishop, from Old Gloucester milk, an endangered breed which was close to extinction; the cheese acquired the name from pear cider from the Stinking Bishop (pear) from Colwall
- Unilever Gloucester, although many ice-creams are reconstituted vegetable oil, with no dairy origin, the Magnum (ice cream), it makes, is a dairy product, and has been the UK's best-selling ice-cream for over thirty years
- Highbridge, Somerset, Bakkavör Desserts makes 700,000 cheesecakes a week
- Ilchester, Somerset, the Ilchester Cheese Company, owned by Tine (company) of Norway, makes Applewood cheese, a smoked Cheddar; a new factory was opened by the Duchess of Kent on Monday September 21 1992
- Lifton, Devon, built next to the South Devon and Tavistock Railway; the process to make canned rice pudding was developed at Lapford in 1936; the redeveloped Ambrosia Creamery opened in April 1959, with production moving from Lapford by Bovril Group, bought by Cavenham Foods in 1971; Ambrosia Creamed Rice was also made by the Magheralin site in County Down from the mid-1960s
- Lostwithiel, Cornwall, the Trewithen Dairy, bought by Ehrmann SE of Germany in 2024
- Melksham, Wiltshire, Coombe Castle International, cheese, formed in 1980 in Corsham
- Newton St Cyres, north west of Exeter, on the A377, Quicke's, it was formed by Sir John Quicke (1922-2009) in 1973
- North Cadbury, in the former South Somerset, Montgomery cheddar
- North Tawton, central Devon, west of the village, north of the A3072, mostly built by Express Foods, opened on April 26 1974, by a Labour minister, now owned by Arla Foods, who are building a £179m mozzarella plant. The Taw Valley Creamery opened in 1874, visited by the Prince of Wales on Wednesday March 19, 1980

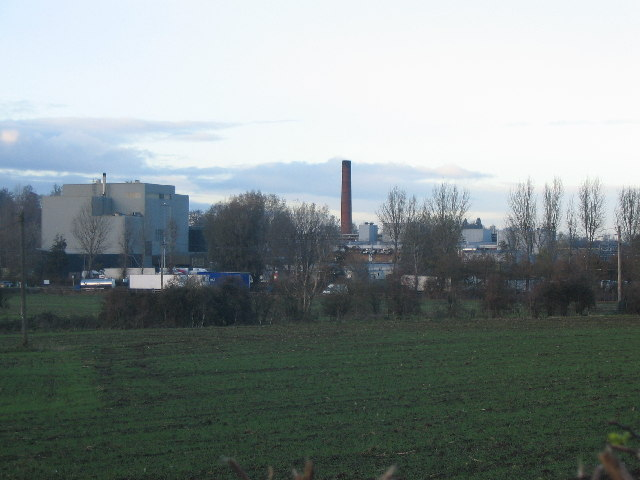
Staplemead Creamery, in east Somerset, in November 2005

- Oldford, east Somerset near the Wiltshire border, Staplemead Creamery, built next to the former Wilts, Somerset and Weymouth Railway. Express Dairy Group bought the Aplin & Barrett site in 1962, opened by Express Dairies around 1963, for the production of cream, on the outskirts of Frome, it replaced Frome Creamery, and made condensed milk. It was bought in February 1992, to make the site the biggest creamery in England and Wales. Made Ski yoghurt for Eden Vale, taken over by Milk Link, now makes desserts; bought from Milk Link in 2008 by Andros (company), of France, who make the well-known popular Bonne Maman chilled desserts, and in a joint arrangement with Arla
- Paignton, Devon, Yalberton Industrial Estate, Chantilly Patisserie, mostly for the foodservice industry

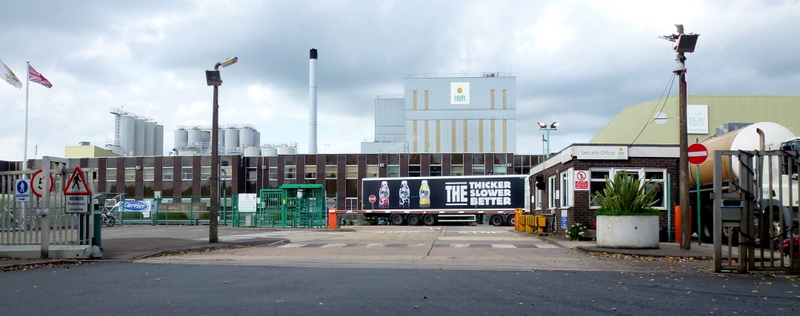
The Severnside factory off the A419 road, seen in October 2014, formerly Dairy Crest

- Stonehouse, Gloucestershire, the Severnside Dairy, former Dairy Crest, opened in 1979. Frijj milkshake was developed at Crudgington in Shropshire in 1991; the large dairy was developed from 2001, costing £39m, now owned by Müller, and Schreiber Foods, of Green Bay, Wisconsin, have a processed cheese plant on the Stroudwater Business Park
- Taunton, Somerdale International, cheese, and Emmi Desserts, the former Mademoiselle Desserts, headquartered in Montigny-le-Bretonneux, part of the Emmi AG dairy company of Switzerland since 2024, with 12 factories
- Upton Cross, near Callington the home of Ginsters, the Cornish Cheese Company, visited by the Princess Royal in January 2018

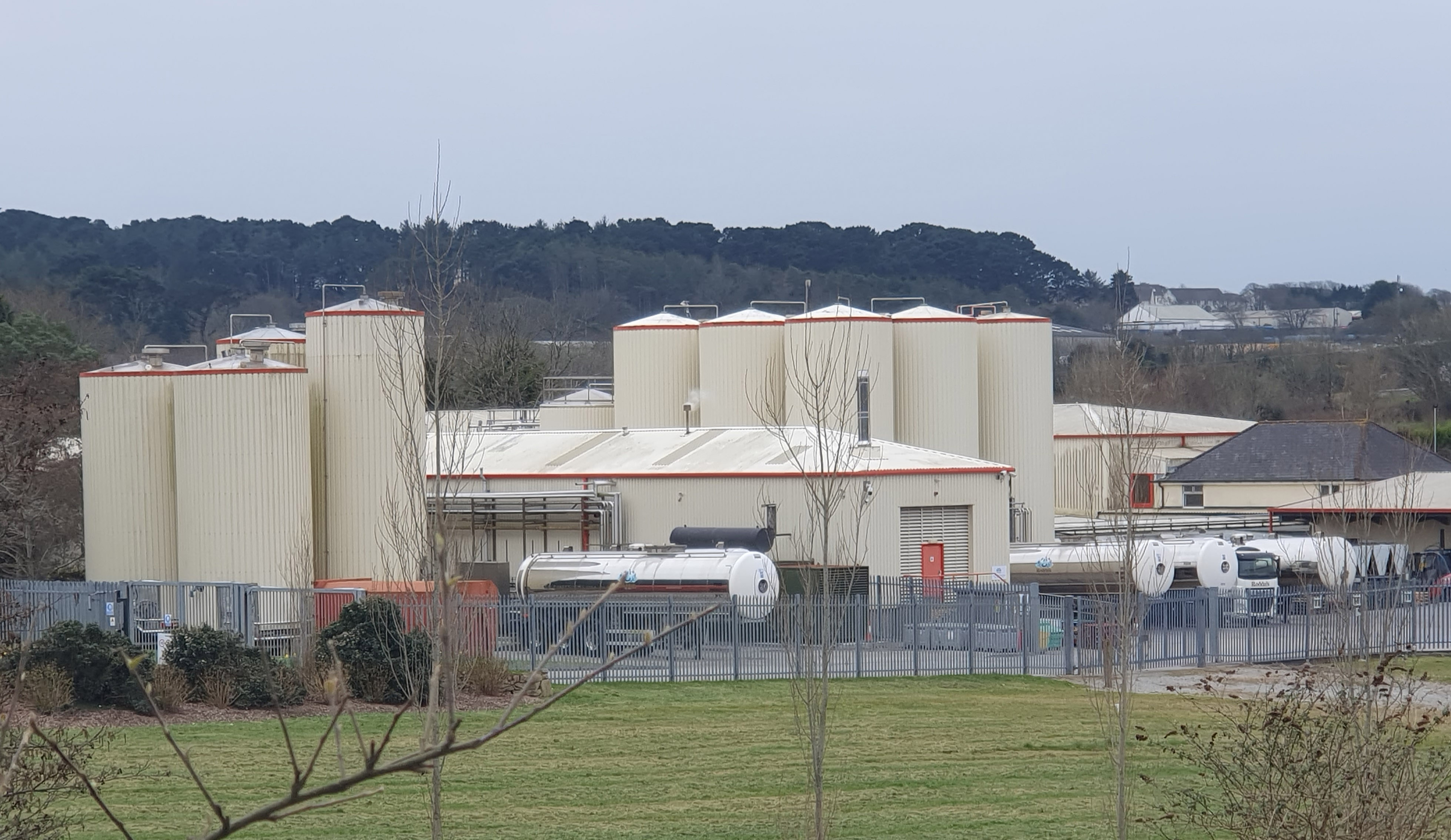
Rodda's in March 2023

- Westbury Creamery, run by Arla in Wiltshire, has makes Anchor butter from September 2012; on the West Wilts Trading Estate, in the north-west of town, off the B3097, close to Heywood, Wiltshire to the north, and Dilton Marsh close to the west, a former Eden Vale plant, visited by the Princess Royal on Monday September 6, 2004
- Wheal Rose, Rodda's, in St Day, the Scorrier Creamery of Rodda's, directly next to the A3047 junction with the A30
- Wyke Champflower, east Somerset, makes Wyke Farms cheddar. Started by Tom Clothier from the 1930s, with milk from the Mendip Hills, followed by his sons John and Jim. It started packing their own cheese from 1982 under the current insignia, making 12 tons of cheese a day by 1987, and sold under the insignia from 1993, turning over £30m by 1998. Cheese packing site is off the A303 in Wincanton.

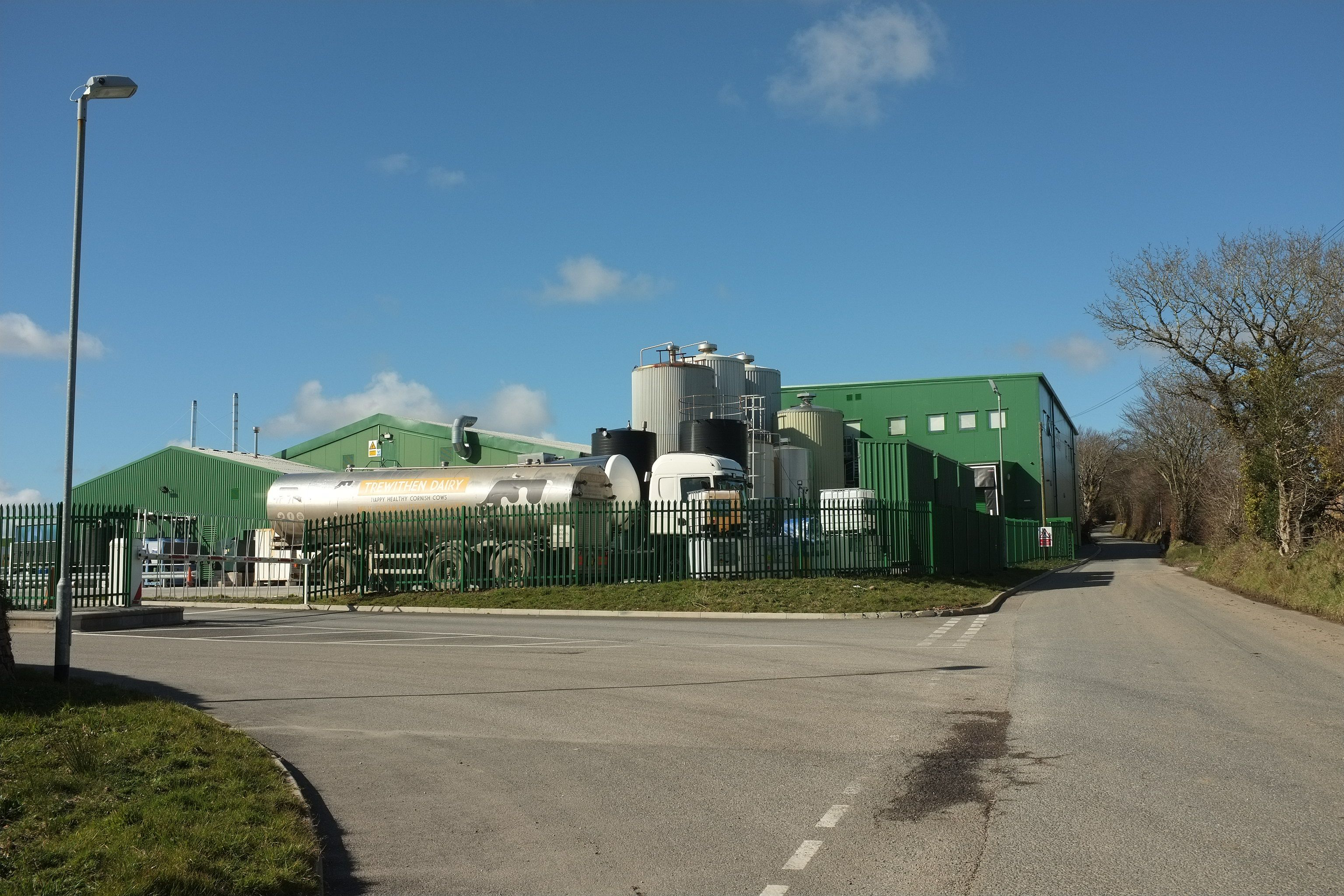
Trewithen Dairy in March 2016

== Former production sites ==
=== Cheddar cheese ===
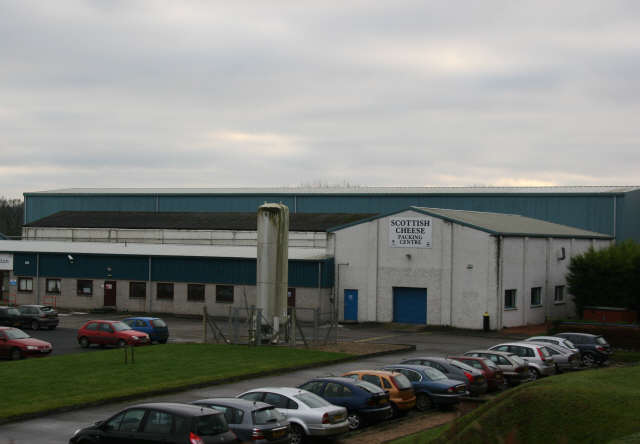
Cheese packing factory in January 2007 at the Mauchline Creamery, at Haugh in East Ayrshire

- Crewe, Cheshire, the former northern distribution depot of Dairy Crest, on Weston Road, it was a former company owned by Sir Wesley Emberton, the chairman from 1952 to 1967 of Cheshire County Council
- Frome, north-east Somerset, former main cheese-packing plant for Cathedral City, until moved to Nuneaton
- Haugh, East Ayrshire, the Mauchline Creamery opened in 1936, making butter, cream and cheese until 2008
- Hemel Hempstead, west Hertfordshire, Dairy Crest cheese-packing plant, closed in November 1991, with the packing moved to Maelor in Wales, but the distribution centre remained; a 125,000 sq ft site was acquired in 1983, on Eastman Way on the Maylands Industrial Estate; cheese packing began from April 1986, when production was moved from Carmarthen; in April 1984 NFC Distribution took over the distribution network and distribution centres of Dairy Crest; from the late 1990s it was run by Exel; from February 15, 2000, the distribution moved to Nuneaton
- Johnstown, Carmarthen, Unigate, taken over by Dairy Crest in 1979, with 441 employees, closed in May 1986, due to EEC cheese imports, notably from Germany and Ireland from 1983
- Lisnaskea, County Fermanagh, Fermanagh Creameries, opened by Unigate in November 1972, made 6,000 tonnes of Cheddar, Double Gloucester and Leicester cheeses each year, part of Dairy Crest, it closed in November 2000; Dairy Crest had taken over the Unigate cheese factories in July 2000

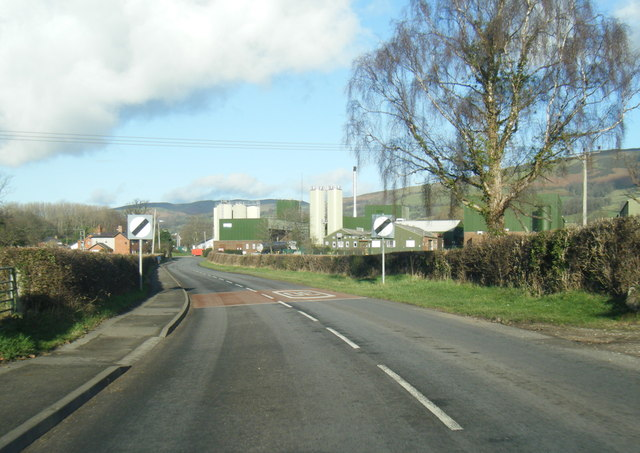
Llandyrnog Creamery in January 2012

- Llandyrnog, north Denbighshire, directly on the B5429, a, former Co-op site, made cheddar cheese for Arla Foods, closed in 2018, with 97 staff
- Newcastle Emlyn, west Wales, Unigate, closed in 1983

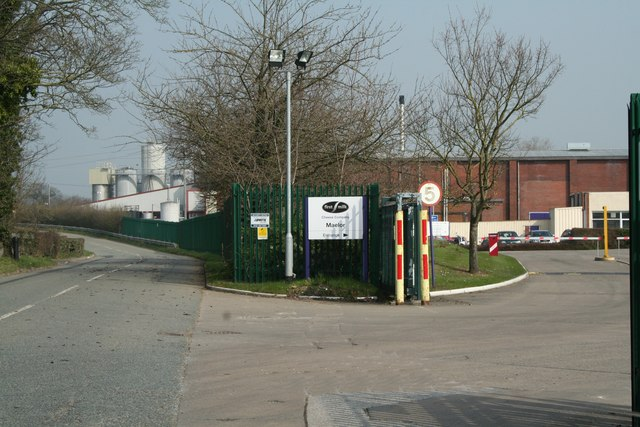
Maelor in March 2009

- Maelor Creamery, Dairy Crest, at Marchwiel, Clwyd, costing £8m. It was built on a former Cadbury plant, to replace creameries at Wem and Four Crosses near Oswestry, which remained open until December 1992. It was one of the largest creameries in the UK, and was computer-controlled from the start. The first stage was completed in July 1974, with butter production to start in 1975, with around 30,000 tonnes a year. It was officially opened by the Queen and the Duke of Edinburgh in May 1976, with Sir Richard Trehane. It would make Cheddar and Cheshire cheese from April 1977, processing 250,000 gallons of milk a day, making 1,200 tons of dairy products a week. 110,000 gallons of milk a day would be for cheese production. In 1987 Cheshire cheese production would be transferred from Whitchurch, in Shropshire, and Haslington in south Cheshire, near the M6. Butter and skimmed milk powder production ended in May 1990. Cheese production ended in June 1993, but it remained as a main cheese packing plant for Cathedral City, as a cheese packing plant for First Milk it closed in March 2014
- Milborne St Andrew, central Dorset, formed in 1929 as an additional site for another at Briantspuddle, Independent Dairies in the 1950s, later Express Dairy Group
- Rooksbridge, north-west Somerset, the Cheddar Valley Dairy Company
- Sturminster Newton, north Dorset, former Milk Marketing Board, as Dairy Crest closed in 2000

=== Other cheese ===
- Aston by Wrenbury, south Cheshire on the A530, the Aston Creamery had been making cheese since 1914, made Lymeswold cheese for Dairy Crest from 1984 to May 1992; the site now produces most supermarket garlic baguettes for Bakkavör
- Augher, County Tyrone
- Ballynure, County Antrim, it was built during the war; Antrim Creameries opened a cheese plant on April 30, 1967, which made Lancashire, Double Gloucester and Leicester for Unigate; the cheese plant was officially opened July 5, 1967
- Bladnoch, Wigtownshire, cheese packing plant, closed in 1989
- Ellesmere, Shropshire, Dairy Crest production closed in late January 1987, and cheese packing finished in early April 1987; Double Gloucester and Leicester cheese production was moved to the Maelor Creamery in north-east Wales
- Harby, Leicestershire, blue cheese, it originally started in 1918, but was built from June 1974 by Unigate Foods, costing £2m; the new site was opened on Monday 18 July 1977, by Unigate chairman Jonathan Fry, to make 1,600 tons per year; it was sold to management-buyout Millway Foods in March 1988, and later worked with Bongrain of France, now Savencia Fromage & Dairy, who bought it; it was visited by Russian deputy minister Maria Scirotina on July 5, 1996; by 1999 it had 170 staff, and was bought in March 1999 by Dairy Crest for £2.5m, who closed the site in late April 2001
- Haslington, south Cheshire near the M6, made Cheshire cheese until 1987
- Hayes, Middlesex, Kraft, made processed cheese from 1926 to 1957; Dairylea spreadable cheese began in 1950
- High Ham, Somerset, a processed cheese plant of St Ivel, from the mid-1920s
- Longridge, central Lancashire, closed by Dairy Crest on 1 November 1994
- Pipe Gate (Woore), north-east Shropshire, Express Dairy, close to Staffordshire and south Cheshire, closed mid-1960
- Saighton, west Cheshire, in the 1930s
- West Ulster, Irvinestown, County Fermanagh, made mozzarella until around 2015

=== Butter ===
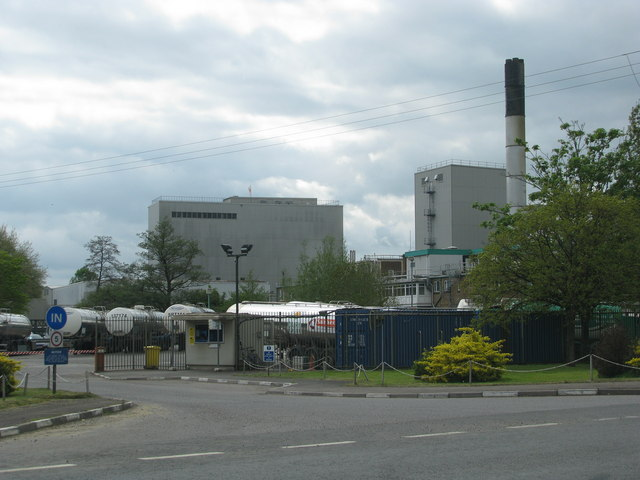
Chard Junction creamery in March 2010

- Chard Junction Creamery, next to Chard Junction railway station, in the south of Somerset, next to the Dorset border. Was United Dairies when opened in 1937, then Unigate from 1959, and St Ivel in the early 1990s; in the 1950s this was the largest butter plant in the world; in May 1957 it produced 86 tons of butter in one day, a world record. Main butter production stopped in 2003, replaced by alcohol butter (brandy butter) and cream products; closed in late 2015.

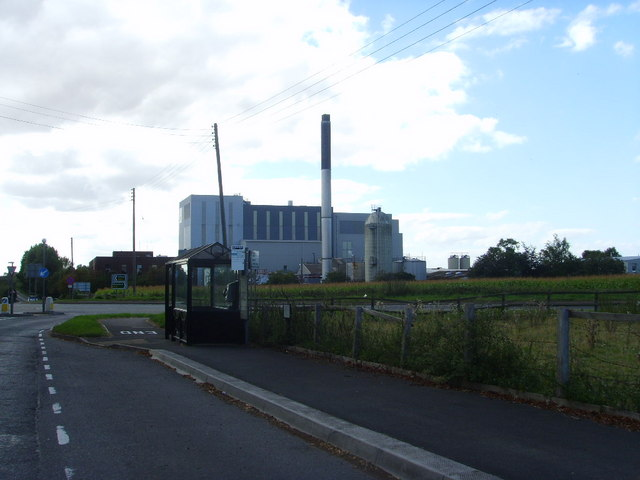
Former Dairy Crest butter factory at Crudgington in east Shropshire

- Crudgington, east Shropshire, north of Telford, former Unigate, largely made 'Country Life' butter. Lymeswold cheese was developed there from 1979 to 1982, at the Dairy Crest Research and Development Centre, which was officially opened on June 6, 1974, by Sir Henry Plumb, the site suffered a large fire in January 1996, and closed as Dairy Crest in 2014, with production of Country Life butter moving to Kirkby in Merseyside
- Felinfach, Wales, opened in 1951, closed in 1988. Champlaine Protex built a cheese factory next door; This site, as Aeron Valley, closed in February 2007. A Dairygold cheese-packing plant, of County Cork, closed in 2006.

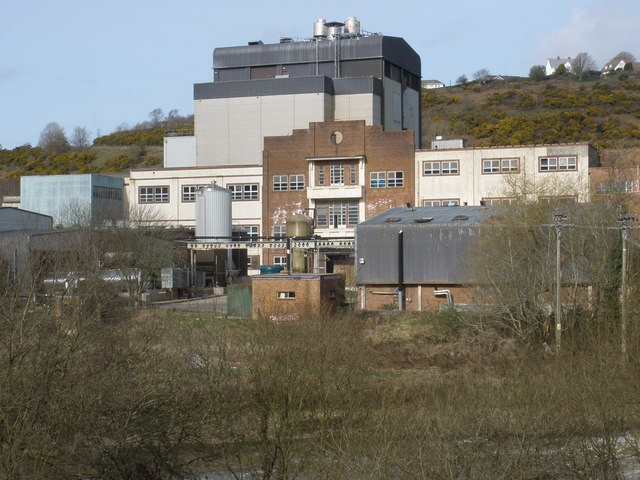
Former butter factory at Great Torrington, owned by Dairy Crest, seen in March 2009

- Great Torrington, north Devon, Unigate, closed around 1993 when Dairy Crest, also made clotted cream
- Hemyock, Devon, formed in 1886, later to be home of St Ivel spreads, which closed in late 1998, with production moving to the Unigate site at Kirkby in Merseyside. In the Blackdown Hills it made St Ivel Gold from 1986 to 1999. Any Questions was broadcast from the site in December 1987, with Roy Jenkins and Tony Blair.
- Honiton, east Devon, Express Dairies, 1969 to 1992
- Hogganfield Creamery, Millerston, construction started in July 1935, and opened in May 1936
- Ruyton-XI-Towns, Shropshire, owned by Kraft from 1936 to 1954

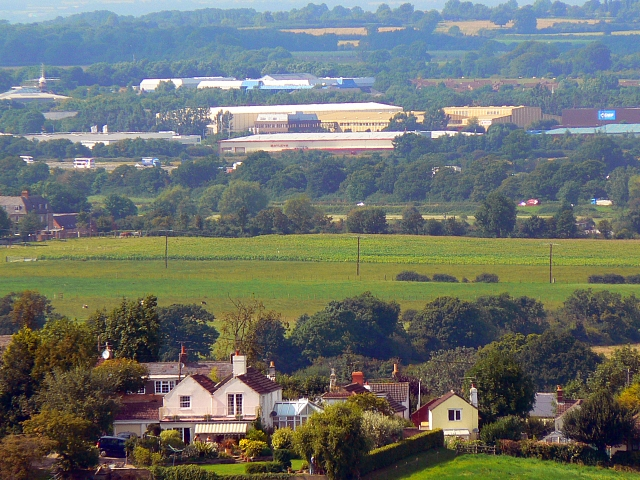
Anchor butter plant in Swindon in August 2007

- Swindon, north Wiltshire, Empire Dairies Limited built a £5m 12-acre butter and cheese-packing plant in Thamesdown in 1979, later owned by Anchor Foods Ltd; it was opened by Prince Edward, Duke of Kent on the morning of 11 June 1980, and visited by Prime Minister Robert Muldoon on Monday 16 May 1983
- Whitland, west Wales, opened in 1911 as United Dairies, handled 1 million litres of milk per day, then Unigate from 1959. Was the largest Dairy Crest creamery, produced 17,000 tonnes of butter per year, and also made yoghurt. It closed unexpectedly on 1 November 1994, which was quite a controversial decision

=== Clotted cream ===
- Lostwithiel, central Cornwall, was Unigate in 1960
- St Erth, south-west Cornwall, was United Dairies, then Unigate, closed in 1997
- Totnes, south Devon, Unigate, closed by Dairy Crest in 2007; it was the largest milk plant in the south west

=== Double cream ===
- Frampton on Severn, Gloucestershire off the M5, Cadbury, opened around 1916, closed around the mid-1970s

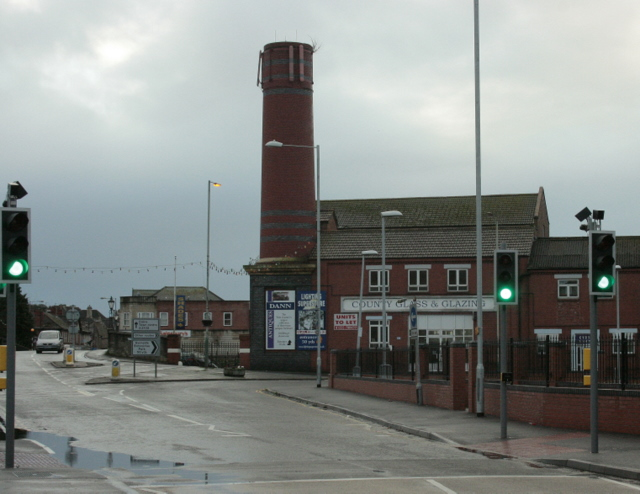
Former Melksham Unigate creamery in December 2009

- Melksham, west Wiltshire, Unigate; there were 256 workers at the St Ivel plant in 1981, which closed in late 1982, with production being moved to Wootton Bassett

=== Desserts ===
- Castledawson, Nestlé condensed milk plant, opened in 1948, the third Nestlé creamery in Northern Ireland, closed in December 1975
- Chichester, Terminus Road, West Sussex, bought by Unigate in November 1970, it made Cadbury chocolate desserts and yoghurt, with 320 employees, it made chilled desserts, mainly fresh cream trifles, from 1989, mostly for supermarkets; there was a huge fire in a warehouse on Wednesday 11 December 1991; in 1997 it was the largest manufacturer of chilled desserts in Europe; a third of production moved to Evercreech in October 1999, and closed six months later in April 2000, with 182 jobs
- Chippenham Creamery, in Wiltshire, Nestlé made condensed milk
- Cuddington, Eddisbury, central Cheshire, west of Northwich, made Ski yoghurt for Express Dairy Foods (Eden Vale); Ski yoghurt had 45% of UK production in the 1970s; Paul Kewan set up Swiss Milk Products in 1963, being bought by Express Dairy Group (Express Dairies) in 1964; the Horners Creamery opened a yoghurt factory on Warrington Road in April 1967 to supply Scotland and the north; Nestlé bought Ski Dairy in February 2002 for £145m, and production was moved to Minsterley in Shropshire
- Dorrington, Shropshire, next to the railway, Unigate in the1980s
- Dunragit Creamery, Dumfries, bought by Nestlé from United Creameries, in August 1940, closed at the end of October 1988, and demolished in April 1989
- Evercreech, east Somerset, opened in March 1892, was C & G Prideaux, Uniq then Greencore, closed in 2018; started on Prestleigh Road, south of Shepton Mallet, on the A371; originally on the Somerset and Dorset Joint Railway, it was bought by Unigate in 1970, known as St Ivel, and made much cheddar cheese in the 1970s, extended from around 1982
- Haywards Heath, Burrell Road, West Sussex, Express Dairies Ski Yoghurt plant, Eden Vale, opened in 1966, and closed in 1986
- Heaton Mersey, south Manchester, Heaton Lane, St Ivel yoghurts in the 1980s, the Garden Dairy, formerly owned by Cheshire Sterilised milk, bought by Unigate by he 1970s, it made desserts and UHT. The yoghurt plant was opened on April 23 1971, by Sir James Barker, the chairman of Unigate

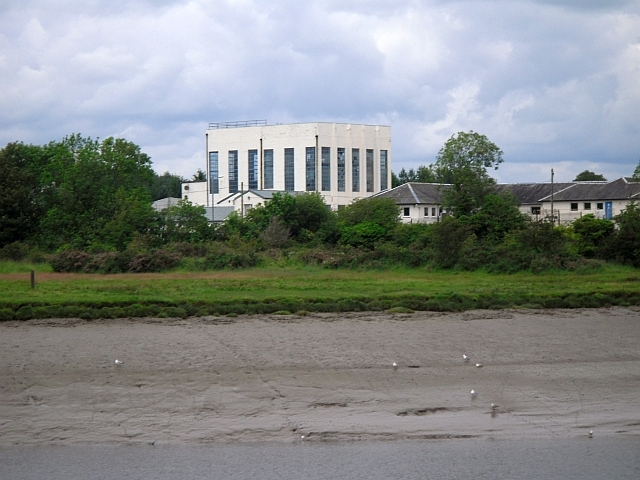
Kirkcudbright in July 2011

- Kirkcudbright, next to the A755, it opened in October 1921, owned by Scottish Pride from 1986; it was bought by Express Dairies in April 1997 for £8m; the UHT plant opened in 1976; Milk Link bought the site, with Crediton in July 2002, and closed the site in 2010
- Milnthorpe, southern Cumbria, a Nestlé plant that made sauces and fruit juice by Libby, which opened in 1935. The site made Libby's Creamed Rice and evaporated milk, until production was moved to southern Derbyshire in 1985. The Nestlé plant closed around early 1995, and made Crosse & Blackwell salad dressing, and tomato ketchup.
- Newark-on-Trent, Fleur-de-Lys Patisseries, on Brunel Drive, was sold to Express Foods in October 1987 for £16m; employees increased from 400 to 650 in 1990; the company was developed by Andreas Liveras (1935–2008), who bought the original company in 1968, and moved to Newark in 1976; Fleur-de-Lys became part of Brossard, from 1990, and changed the site name to Brossard in October 1992; in July 1997 the Brossard site had 800 employees, when it was sold to an American large company; from July 1998 it was called The Dessert Company, but closed in March 2000 after losing a Tesco contract.
- Okehampton, central Devon, North Road, UB Frozen Foods, it merged with Ross in 1988, becoming Ross in 1992, with 420 staff, it was the main cheesecake manufacturing site in the UK from 1993, it made 90% of retail cheesecakes in UK; it was sold to Polestar Foods in November 2009; it became Devonshire Desserts in February 2011, part of Country Style Foods, but closed
- Nestlé Omagh, County Tyrone, made condensed milk from the 1940s, then Nesquik until 1999, when production of Coffee-Mate moved to Dalston in Cumbria; the site was the biggest single employer in Omagh; it was bought by Lakeland Dairies in March 2002; Nestlé condensed milk production moved to the Netherlands in 2003
- Paignton, Devon, established in 1974 under Ross Group, which merged with United Biscuits in 1988, with 370 staff; the company had 18 chilled food factories in the UK; the site, with Stratford-upon-Avon and Henley-in-Arden, was sold in January 1991, and the company closed a sandwich factory at Bonnyrigg, in the south of Edinburgh the site was bought by Unigate in July 1991; Uniq closed the site in late 2009, with production being moved to Evercreech in eastern Somerset; the site made trifles;
- Royal Wootton Bassett, north Wiltshire, south of the M4, was United Dairies, then Unigate, then St Ivel, being the headquarters; it made yoghurt and the 'Gold' margarine, and closed in 2003; built in the former North Wiltshire, and opened around 1914 with United Dairies; it made yoghurt from 1968; a £20m St Ivel plant construction started in August 1981 a £25m plant opened in 1984, that each day could make 3,000 gallons each of double cream and of single cream, and 2,500 gallons of whipped cream, and 500,000 pots of yoghurt, being Europe's largest dairy unit; it was officially opened in the afternoon of May 24, 1984 by Princess Alexandra; it had the Unigate Group Technical Centre; the St Ivel Gold spread was taken from Swedish food scientists Olof Bo Sven Strinning (born November 20, 1942) and Karl-Erik Thurell (May 1924 - 8 December 2010), who had developed the process at Arla in Stockholm around 1972-73 being launched in Sweden as 'Lätt och Lagom', and launched in 1974; Unigate was the first company to license the process in 1977; Arla had also launched a similar product Bregott in 1969, made at Götene in Sweden; bottling stopped in 1991, with production centred on Shape yoghurt; when the yoghurt division, St Ivel Fresh Foods, was sold to Danone, the site was not included, so had to close in 2003; the site was sold, by Uniq, to a house developer in August 2004
- South Morden, south London, the Morden site was opened on April 21, 1955, by Derick Heathcoat-Amory, 1st Viscount Amory; the Duke of Edinburgh visited South Morden on Tuesday November 12, 1957; the three-acre site cost £700,000; UHT milk was sold in Tetra Brik cartons; Princess Anne visited on Wednesday October 29, 1980;
- Staverton Mill, in Wiltshire, made condensed milk for a former division of Nestlé, from 1897, until 1972, and yoghurt, after Nestlé bought the Chambourcy yoghurt. Made yoghurt until 2004, and has made Shredded Wheat from 2007
- Sydenham, Leamington Spa, a UB Frozen Foods site on St Mary's Road, established from 1981, it made frozen gateaux and cheesecakes, under the McVities name; its Raspberry Pavlova won awards in 1988, and it also made desserts for M&S. It merged with Ross in 1988, with the frozen division sold to a US company in October 1999, and later sold to Polestar Foods in November 2009, being closed in February 2011
- Tullygoonigan Condensery, on the A29 road (Northern Ireland), north of Armagh, near the border of County Tyrone and County Armagh; it opened in October 1948, and was officially opened in early May 1949, it made tinned evaporated milk, and butter, for the Co-op; it was to close at the end of October 1987, but was bought in November 1987 by Augher Co-operative, to make cheese, known as AMK Foods
- Whittington, Shropshire, bought by Express Dairies in 1954, made Eden Vale fresh cream dairy desserts from July 1970

== Delivery ==
Until the 1960s milk was delivered seven days a week, but this was made more difficult in October 1964 by the introduction of the 40-hour five-day week. Previously most people worked a 48-hour week.

In 1966 around 100,000 people worked in the supply of milk. It was proposed in 1966 to move daily deliveries of milk, to every other day, to save petrol. The United States did not have Daily deliveries of milk.

There were around 40,000 milkmen in 1983, and milk was set at 21p a pint. 86% was delivered. In 1983 the OFT was looking at taking the household delivery of milk to the Restrictive Practices Court. In 1989 15m homes were served by 34,000 milkmen.

Only 3% of milk in the UK is delivered to the door. There was an 80% drop in deliveries when supermarkets began to sell their own milk en masse. The largest commercial deliverer of milk in the UK has around 500,000 customers because there has been a recent upswing in demand for door deliveries.

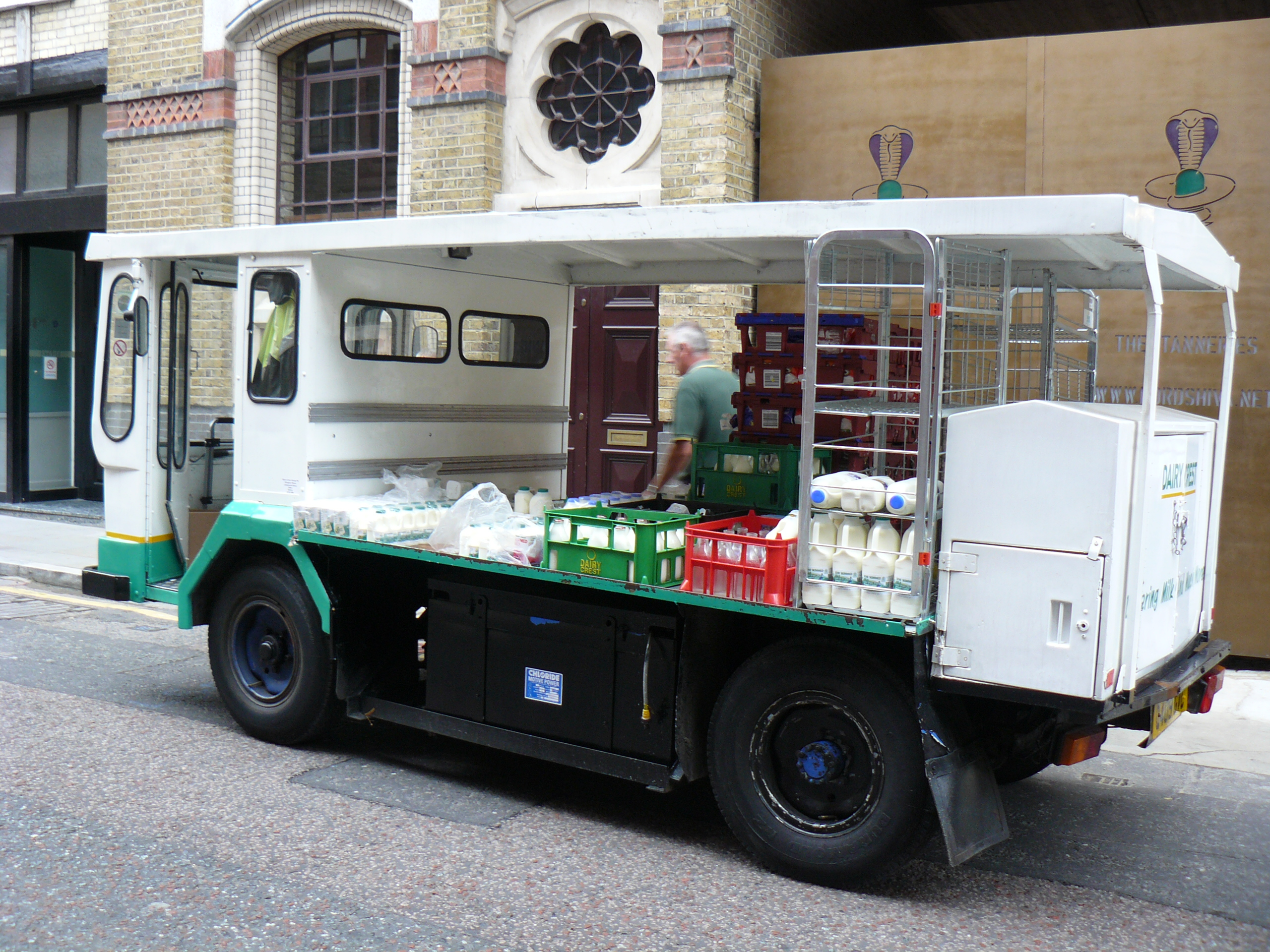
Milk float in September 2007

Most milk floats in the UK were designed by Lippincott & Margulies. Most of the rechargeable batteries, in the UK, were made by Chloride Group.

== Organisations ==
The British Dairy Institute was established at Aylesbury, by the British Dairy Farmers Association.

The Milk Development Council was created in 1994 under the Industrial Organisation and Development Act 1947; under the Natural Environment and Rural Communities Act 2006 it became part of the AHDB.

=== Research ===
The Hannah Dairy Research Institute was in St Quivox in South Ayrshire from 1928 until 2006. It founded the Journal of Dairy Research. The first director was Sir Norman Wright, who in 1947 became scientific advisor at the Ministry of Food. He was succeeded in 1948 by Sir Kenneth Blaxter (animal nutritionist).

United Dairies built a £457,000 five-storey research centre in west London from 1964, built by Holland, Hannen & Cubitts.

=== Education ===
County Tyrone and County Fermanagh are established dairy areas; the Ulster Dairy School was at Cookstown in County Tyrone.

== Regulation ==
Production was regulated by the Milk Marketing Board until 1994; its processing division is now Dairy Crest. AHDB Dairy is a central resource for the UK dairy industry.

== Environmental impact ==
The dairy industry is a large source of waterway pollution in the UK. It is linked to half of all farm pollution, largely from the waste produced by cows. This pollution leads to fish kills and general harm to river ecosystems.

== See also ==
- List of British cheeses
- List of Cornish cheeses
- List of largest dairy companies
- Food industry in the United Kingdom

=== Other countries ===
- Mejerier i Danmark, the Danish dairy industry
- Danish Dairy Board
- List of German dairy companies
- Cheesemaking in Switzerland
