= Château Le Manais =

Château in Normandy (France)

Coordinates: 49°29′9″N 1°45′32″E

Le Manais, a château at Ferrières-en-Bray near Gournay-en-Bray in Normandy, built in 1730, was a three-story building in extensive farmlands.

In the late 1940s, Le Manais was the home of the Count and Countess Du Plessix.
