= Ski Dairy =

British dairy and yogurt brand

- Founded: 1963
- Founder: Eden Vale
- Headquarters: Haywards Heath, Sussex, United Kingdom
- Area served: Europe, Australia (until 2006)
- Parent: Nestlé
- Website: www.skidairy.co.uk

Ski Dairy is a British dairy and yogurt brand owned by Nestle.

== History ==
The brand was founded by Express Dairies in Haywards Heath in 1963 and was the first yogurt to contain fruit pieces. It was bought out by Fonterra and Nestle in 2002 and was popular around Europe and Australia (until 2006).

== Recall ==
In 2020 the Food Standards Agency recalled Ski yogurts for claims that it contained pieces of rubber. It is unknown whether this was resolved. Nestle UK says it was due to a manufacturing error.
