= Ferrières-en-Bray =

- Commune
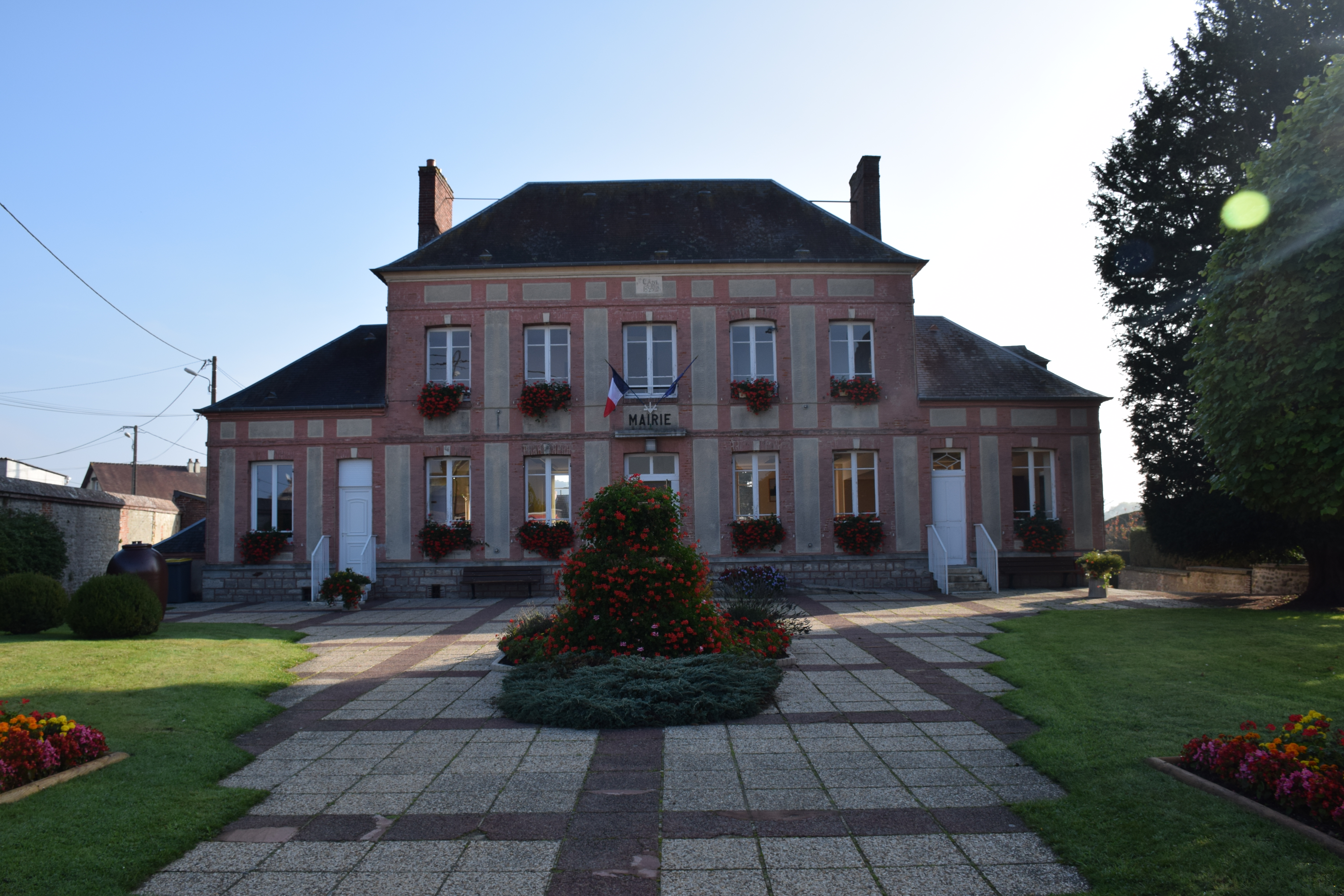
- The town hall in Ferrières-en-Bray
- Location of Ferrières-en-Bray
- Location within France Location within Normandy
- Coordinates: 49°29′01″N 1°44′44″E
- Country: France
- Region: Normandy
- Department: Seine-Maritime
- Arrondissement: Dieppe
- Canton: Gournay-en-Bray
- Intercommunality: CC 4 rivières

Government
  - Mayor (2026–32): Marie-France Devillerval
- Area^{1}: 15.88 km^{2} (6.13 sq mi)
- Elevation: 105 m (344 ft)
- Highest elevation: 189 m (620 ft)
- Lowest elevation: 86 m (282 ft)
- Population (2023): 1,669
  - Density: 105.1/km^{2} (272.2/sq mi)
- Time zone: UTC+01:00 (CET)
  - Summer (DST): UTC+02:00 (CEST)
- INSEE/Postal code: 76260 /76220
- ^{1} French Land Register data, which excludes lakes, ponds, glaciers > 1 km^{2} (0.386 sq mi or 247 acres) and river estuaries.

Ferrières-en-Bray (French pronunciation: [fɛʁjɛʁ ɑ̃ bʁɛ], literally Ferrières in Bray) is a commune in the Seine-Maritime department in the Normandy region in northern France.

== Geography ==
A small town of farming and associated light industry situated by the banks of the river Auchy in the Pays de Bray, some 30 miles (48 km) east of Rouen, at the junction of the D21, the D928 and the N31 roads. The commune forms part of the border with the region of Picardy.

== Population ==
Historical population
Year	Pop.	±% p.a.
1968	1,332	—
1975	1,485	+1.57%
1982	1,577	+0.86%
1990	1,644	+0.52%
1999	1,643	−0.01%
2007	1,689	+0.35%
2012	1,645	−0.53%
2017	1,674	+0.35%
2023	1,669	−0.05%
Source: INSEE

== Places of interest ==
- The Château Le Manais, built in 1730.
- The church of St.Martin, dating from the sixteenth century.
- The Danone factory, where Charles Gervais started the company in the 19th century.

== See also ==
- Communes of the Seine-Maritime department
