= Anthony Hailwood =

Anthony Hailwood (4 July 1838 – 24 June 1922) was the first person to sell sterilised milk in the United Kingdom.

== Early life ==
Hailwood was born in Rochdale and brought up in Salford, Lancashire, where he worked as a milk boy from the age of four. He also worked as a tier-boy to a block printer for one shilling and sixpence (equal to 7½p) a week. At the age of 8, he worked for Jacob Bright of Rochdale as a half-timer, whereby he spent some time at school, and worked in cotton mills until the age of 15.

== Dairy industry ==
Hailwood entered the dairy industry in 1858. He was one of the founders of the Worleston Dairy Institute, the first of its kind in the UK, at Aston juxta Mondrum in Cheshire, which closed in 1926.

He later owned Rose Tree Farm, and Black Greyhound Farm with 85 acres, at Lostock Gralam, near Northwich in Cheshire.

== Milk sterilisation ==
In 1894, Hailwood began the commercial sterilisation of milk in the UK, providing it under the name of the Cheshire Sterilised Milk Company. This meant that milk could be stored for a longer time.

== Personal life ==
He lived at Victoria Lodge, on Lower Broughton Road in Higher Broughton in Salford (near where the A576 crosses the River Irwell).

He was a member of the Salford Town Council for many years.
