= MV Hero =

Roll-on/roll-off cargo ferry which sunk in the North Sea

MV Hero was a roll-on/roll-off cargo ferry which sank in the North Sea in bad weather in November 1977, with the loss of one crew member, when the stern door lost watertight integrity. The Hero′s pumps could not remove the volumes of water.
