= Katharine Coward =

British pharmacologist (1885-1978)

Katharine Hope Coward
- Born: 2 July 1885; Blackburn, Lancashire, United Kingdom
- Died: 8 July 1978 (aged 93)
- Education: University of Manchester; University College London; University of Wisconsin
- Known for: Vitamin A research

Katharine Hope Coward was a British pharmacologist and early adopter of chromatographic techniques.

== Early life and education ==
Coward was born on 2 July 1885 in Blackburn, Lancashire, England. She studied Botany and graduated M.Sc. from the University of Manchester. After a few years, she joined University College London to study biochemistry and perform research under J. C. Drummond on Vitamin A, paving the way for her to be elected a Fellow of the Chemical Society in 1923.

== Career ==
In 1925, Coward received a Rockefeller Fellowship to continue her studies and research on vitamin A in the Department of Agricultural Chemistry at the University of Wisconsin–Madison under Dr. Harry Steenbock. On her return to Britain, she was appointed head of the Nutrition Department of the Royal Pharmaceutical Society's pharmacological laboratories, in which position she remained until her retirement in 1950. In 1937, she was elected as an honorary member of the Pharmaceuticals Society.

She was the "most prolific woman contributor to the Biochemical Journal between 1906 and 1939".

== Chromatographic study of carotenoids ==
Because of her interest in nutrition and nutrients, Coward was one of the early adopters of chromatography following its introduction in 1906–1911 by Mikhail Tsvet.

Carotenoids, a class of structurally similar pigment molecules that include carotenes and xanthophylls, were of particular interest in nutritional research due to their demonstrated importance in animal studies. In his pioneering chromatographic research, Tsvet showed the presence of four different xanthophylls in his studies of plant extracts, separated through the use of adsorption chromatography. Following L. S. Palmer's descriptions of Tsvet's experiment in 1922, Coward replicated the methodology, the results of which she published in 1923. During these studies Coward noted the presence of additional pigment (which would later be determined to be carotenes) in the eluent fractions, nearly developing a chromatographic method for the isolation of vitamin A from the carotenoids. This experiment made her the fifth scientist to adopt the use of chromatography, during a "dormant" period before the technique's popularization in the 1930s.

This early research applying adsorption chromatography would continue in her role at the Royal Pharmaceutical Society, in conjunction with other analytical methods.

== Death ==
Coward died at the age of 93 on 8 July 1978.
