= Wolfe cycle =

Methanogenic pathway

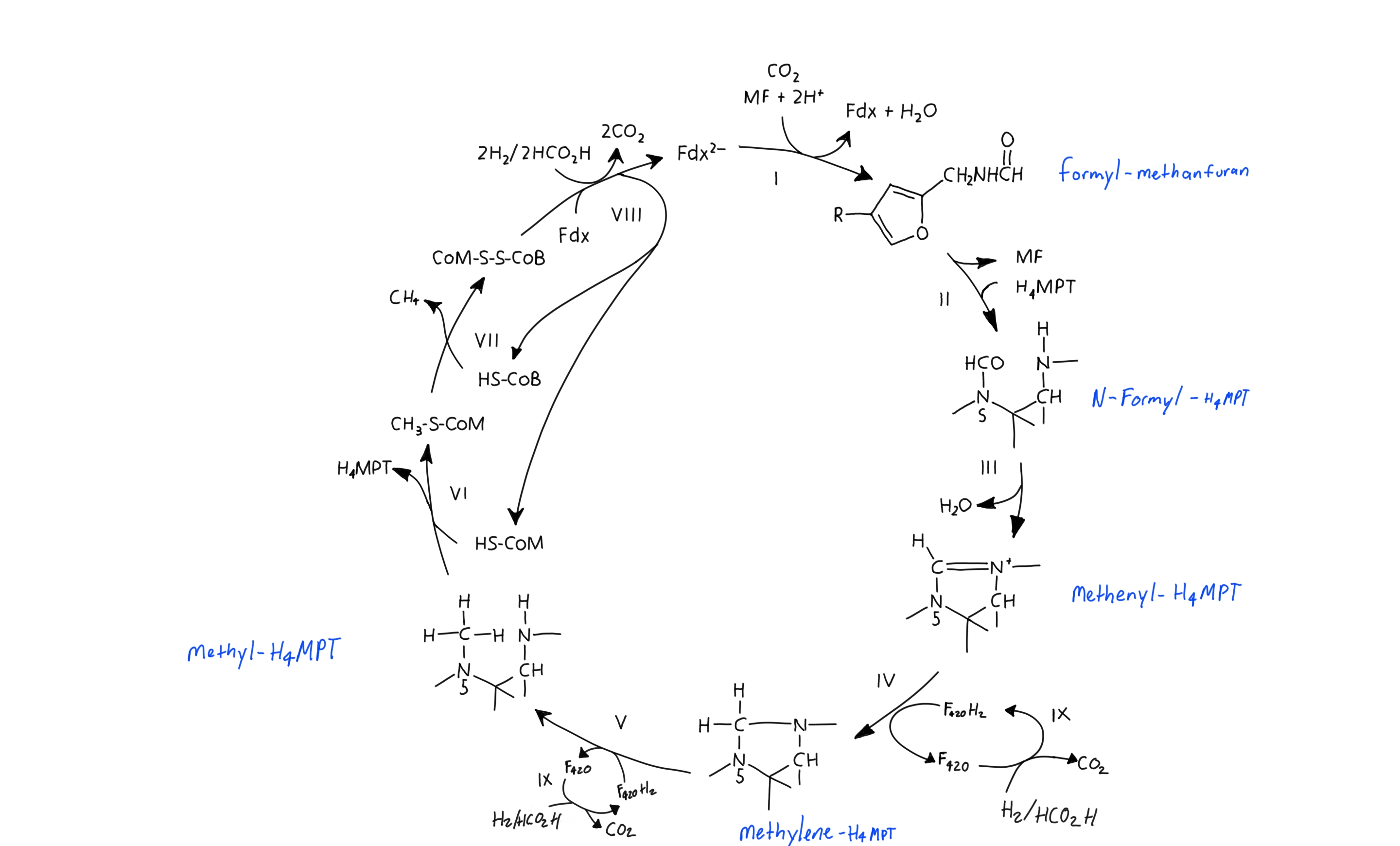
Wolfe cycle

The Wolfe Cycle is a methanogenic pathway used by archaea; the archaeon takes H_{2} and CO_{2} and cycles them through a various intermediates to create methane. The Wolfe Cycle is modified in different orders and classes of archaea as per the resource availability and requirements for each species, but it retains the same basic pathway. The pathway begins with the reducing carbon dioxide to formylmethanofuran. The last step uses heterodisulfide reductase (Hdr) to reduce heterodisulfide into Coenzyme B and Coenzyme M using Fe_{4}S_{4} clusters. Evidence suggests this last step goes hand-in-hand with the first step, and feeds back into it, creating a cycle. At various points in the Wolfe Cycle, intermediates that are formed are taken out of the cycle to be used in other metabolic processes. Since intermediates are being taken out at various points in the cycle, there is also a replenishing (anaplerotic) reaction that feeds into the Wolfe cycle, this is to regenerate necessary intermediates for the cycle to continue. Overall, including the replenishing reaction, the Wolfe Cycle has a total of nine steps. While Obligate $\ce{CO2}$ reducing methanogens perform additional steps to reduce CO_{2} to $\ce{CH3}$.

== Discovery ==
In 1971, in a review published by Ralph Stoner Wolfe, information regarding methanogenesis in M. bryantii was published. At the time, the only thing known about this process was that Coenzyme M was involved. In addition, methanogenesis was thought to follow a linear pathway. It was not until 1986 that the reduction of $\ce{CO2}$ to $\ce{CH4}$ was proposed to occur in a cycle when it was shown that Steps 8 and 1 are coupled.

== Steps ==
The Wolfe Cycle follows multiple pathways, depending on the microbe. Below are generalized steps in the Wolfe Cycle.

steps	reactants	Enzymes	Products used in cycle
1	$\ce{CO2 + MF +2H+}$	Formyl-methanofuran dehydrogenase	$\ce{Formyl - MFR}$
2	$\ce{N-Formyl - MFR + H4MPT}$	Formyltransferase	$\ce{N-Formyl-H4MPT}$
3	$\ce{Formyl - H4MPT + H+}$	methenyl-H_{4}MPT cyclohydrolase	$\ce{methenyl-H4MPT}$
4	$\ce{Methenyl - H4MPT + F420H2}$	methylene-H_{4}MPT dehydrogenase	$\ce{methylene-H4MPT}$
5	$\ce{Methylene - H4MPT + F420H2}$	methylene-H_{4}MPT reductase	$\ce{methyl-H4MPT}$
6	$\ce{methyl-H4MPT + HS-CoM}$	methyl-H_{4}MPT/HSCoM methyl transferase	$\ce{CH3-S-CoM}$
7	$\ce{CH3-S-CoM + HS-CoB}$	methyl-S-CoM reductase	$\ce{CoM-S-S-CoB}$
8	$\ce{CoM-S-S-CoB + Fdx (ferredoxin)}$	electron bifurcating hydrogenase-heterodisulfide reductase complex	$\ce{Fdx^2- + HS-CoB + HS-CoM}$
9	$\ce{F420 + H2 + HCO2H}$	F_{420}-reducing hydrogenase	$\ce{CO2 + F420H}$
