= Arla =

Arla may refer to:

- Arla (moth), a genus of moth
- Arkansas Library Association
- Arla, Greece, a village
- Ärla, a village in south-eastern Sweden
- Arla Foods, a large Scandinavian producer of dairy products
  - Arla (Finland), a subsidiary of Arla Foods
  - Arla Foods UK, a subsidiary of Arla Foods
- ARLA, Armée révolutionnaire de libération de l'Azawad (French), Revolutionary Liberation Army of Azawad
- Association of Residential Letting Agents in the UK
