= Methyltransferase 2 =

Methyltransferase 2 may refer to:

- (Methyl-Co(III) methanol-specific corrinoid protein):coenzyme M methyltransferase
- (Methyl-Co(III) methylamine-specific corrinoid protein):coenzyme M methyltransferase
- (Methyl-Co(III) tetramethylammonium-specific corrinoid protein):coenzyme M methyltransferase
