= Fumarate reductase =

Enzyme converting fumarate to succinate

Fumarate reductase is the enzyme that converts fumarate to succinate, and is important in microbial metabolism as a part of anaerobic respiration. The catalyzed reaction is:

succinate + donor ↔ fumarate + oxidised donor

Fumarate reductases can be divided into three classes depending on the electron donor:

- Fumarate reductase (NADH) (EC 1.3.1.6)
fumaric acid
+ NADH
H^{+}
H^{+}
succinic acid
+ NAD^{+}

The enzyme is monomeric and soluble, and can reduce fumarate independently from the electron transport chain. Fumarate reductase is absent from all mammalian cells.

- Fumarate reductase (CoM/CoB) (EC 1.3.4.1):
  This enzyme is present in most methanogenic archea. It is cytoplasmic and uses coenzymes M and B as hydrogen donors.
- Fumarate reductase (quinol) (EC 1.3.5.1)
  The membrane-bound enzyme covalently linked to flavin cofactors, which is composed of 3 or 4 subunits, transfers electrons from a quinol to fumarate. This class of enzyme is thus involved in the production of ATP by oxidative phosphorylation.
