= MT2 =

MT2 may refer to:

- Melatonin receptor 1B
- Metallothionein 2A
- Melanotan II, a synthetic hormone that induces melanin production
- Metals Treatment Technologies
- (Methyl-Co(III) methylamine-specific corrinoid protein):coenzyme M methyltransferase
- Monster Train 2
- Montana Highway 2
- Montana's 2nd congressional district
- No. 2 Morse taper, a size of machine taper
- Boss MT-2 Metal Zone, a distortion pedal
