= Acetogenesis =

Biosynthesis of acetic acid by prokaryotes

Acetogenesis is a process through which acetyl-CoA or acetic acid is produced by anaerobic bacteria through the reduction of CO_{2} via the Wood–Ljungdahl pathway. Other microbial processes that produce acetic acid (like certain types of fermentation or the oxidative breakdown of carbohydrates or ethanol by acetic acid bacteria) are not considered acetogenesis. The diverse bacterial species capable of acetogenesis are collectively called acetogens.

Reduction of CO_{2} to acetic acid via the Wood–Ljungdahl pathway requires an electron source (e.g., H_{2}, CO, formate, etc.). When acetogens are grown autotrophically, they synthesize acetic acid only through the Wood–Ljungdahl pathway; but when they are grown heterotrophically, they can produce additional acetic acid by oxidation of the carbon source (carbohydrates, organic acids, or alcohols). Once produced, acetyl-CoA can be incorporated into biomass or converted to acetic acid.

== Discovery ==
In 1932, organisms were discovered that could convert hydrogen gas and carbon dioxide into acetic acid. The first acetogenic bacterium species, Clostridium aceticum, was discovered in 1936 by Klaas Tammo Wieringa. A second species, Moorella thermoacetica, attracted wide interest because of its ability, reported in 1942, to convert glucose into three moles of acetic acid, a process called homoacetate fermentation.

== Biochemistry ==
The precursor to acetic acid is the thioester acetyl CoA. The key aspects of the acetogenic pathway are several reactions that include the reduction of carbon dioxide (CO_{2}) to carbon monoxide (CO) and the attachment of CO to a methyl group (–CH_{3}) and coenzyme A. The first process is catalyzed by enzymes called carbon monoxide dehydrogenase. The coupling of the methyl group (provided by methylcobalamin), the CO, and the coenzyme A is catalyzed by acetyl-CoA synthase.

The global reduction reaction of CO_{2} into acetic acid by H_{2} is the following:

2 CO_{2} + 4 H_{2} → CH_{3}COOH + 2 H_{2}O ΔG° = −95 kJ/mol

The conversion of one mole of glucose into three moles of acetic acid is also a thermodynamically favorable reaction:

C_{6}H_{12}O_{6} → 3 CH_{3}COOH ΔG° = −310.9 kJ/mol

However, what matters for the cell is how much ATP is generated. This depends on the substrate.

== Applications ==
The unique metabolism of acetogens has significance in biotechnological uses. In carbohydrate fermentations, the decarboxylation reactions end in the conversion of organic carbon into carbon dioxide. In the production of biofuels, the need to reduce CO_{2} emissions, as well as the need to be competitive, means that this inefficiency should perhaps be eliminated by using acetogens. Acetogenesis does not replace glycolysis with a different pathway but rather captures the CO_{2} from glycolysis and uses it to produce acetic acid. Although three molecules of acetic acid can be produced in this way, production of three molecules of ethanol would require an additional reducing agent such as hydrogen gas.
