= CO-methylating acetyl-CoA synthase =

Enzyme

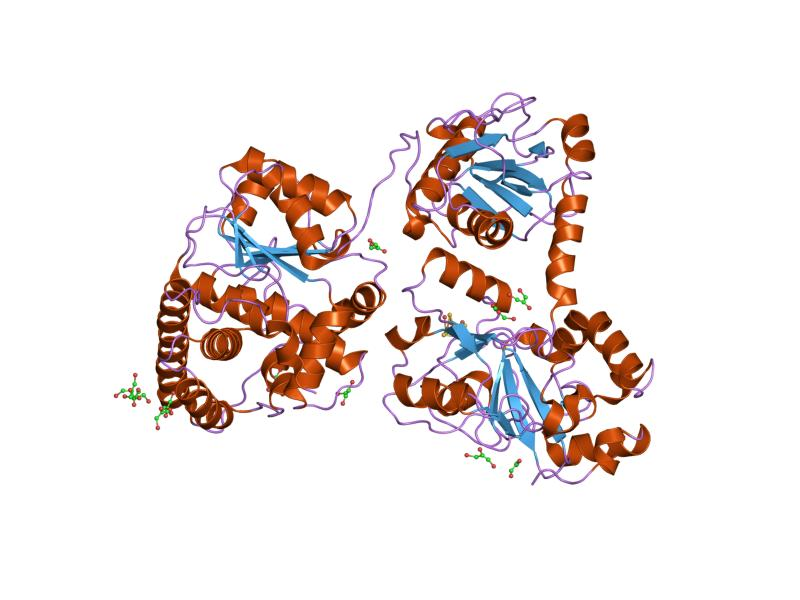
- Monomeric Acetyl-CoA synthase

Identifiers
- EC no.: 2.3.1.169

Databases
- IntEnz: IntEnz view
- BRENDA: BRENDA entry
- ExPASy: NiceZyme view
- KEGG: KEGG entry
- MetaCyc: metabolic pathway
- PRIAM: profile
- PDB structures: RCSB PDB PDBe PDBsum
- Gene Ontology: AmiGO / QuickGO
Search
- PMC: articles
- PubMed: articles
- NCBI: proteins

Acetyl-CoA synthase (ACS), not to be confused with acetyl-CoA synthetase or acetate-CoA ligase (ADP forming), is a nickel-containing enzyme involved in the metabolic processes of cells. Together with carbon monoxide dehydrogenase (CODH), it forms the bifunctional enzyme Acetyl-CoA Synthase/Carbon Monoxide Dehydrogenase (ACS/CODH) found in anaerobic microorganisms such as archaea and bacteria. The ACS/CODH enzyme works primarily through the Wood–Ljungdahl pathway which converts carbon dioxide to Acetyl-CoA. The recommended name for this enzyme is CO-methylating acetyl-CoA synthase.

== Chemistry ==
In nature, there are six different pathways where CO_{2} is fixed. Of these, the Wood–Ljungdahl pathway is the predominant sink in anaerobic conditions. Acetyl-CoA Synthase (ACS) and carbon monoxide dehydrogenase (CODH) are integral enzymes in this one pathway and can perform diverse reactions in the carbon cycle as a result. Because of this, the exact activity of these molecules has come under intense scrutiny over the past decade.

=== Wood–Ljungdahl pathway ===
The Wood–Ljungdahl pathway consists of two different reactions that break down carbon dioxide. The first pathway involves CODH converting carbon dioxide into carbon monoxide through a two-electron transfer, and the second reaction involves ACS synthesizing acetyl-CoA using the carbon monoxide from CODH together with coenzyme-A (CoA) and a methyl group from a corrinoid iron-sulfur protein, CFeSP. The two main overall reactions are as follows:

$\ce{CO2 + 2H+ + 2e- <=> CO + H2O}$	1

$\ce{CO + CH3-CFeSP + CoA <=>} \text{ acetyl-CoA} + \ce{CFeSP}$	2

The acetyl-CoA produced can be used in a variety of ways depending on the needs of the organism. For example, acetate-forming bacteria use acetyl-CoA for their autotrophic growth processes, and methanogenic archae such as Methanocarcina barkeri convert the acetyl-CoA into acetate and use it as an alternative source of carbon instead of CO_{2}.

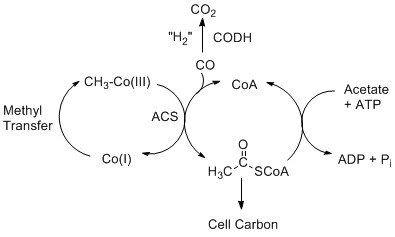
Autotrophic growth via the Wood–Ljungdahl pathway. Adapted from Ragsdale et al.

Acetogenic bacteria use this method to generate acetate and acetic acid. Since the above two reactions are reversible, it opens up a diverse range of reactions in the carbon cycle. In addition to acetyl-CoA production, the reverse can occur with ACS producing CO and returning the methyl piece back to the corrinoid protein.

Along with the process of methanogenesis, organisms can subsequently convert the acetate to methane. Furthermore, the Wood-Ljungdahl pathway allows for the anaerobic oxidation of acetate where ATP is used to convert acetate into acetyl-CoA, which is then broken down by ACS to produce carbon dioxide that is released into the atmosphere.

=== Other reactions ===
It has been discovered that the CODH/ACS enzyme in the bacteria M. theroaceticum can make dinitrogen (N_{2}) from nitrous oxide in the presence of an electron-donating species. It can also catalyze the reduction of the pollutant, 2,4,6-trinitrotoluene (TNT) and catalyze the oxidation of n-butyl isocyanide.

== Structure ==
=== History ===
The first, and one of the most comprehensive, crystal structures of ACS/CODH from the bacteria M. thermoacetica was presented in 2002 by Drennan and colleagues. In this paper they constructed a heterotetramer, with the active site "A-cluster" residing in the ACS subunit and the active site "C-cluster" in CODH subunit. Furthermore, they resolved the structure of the A-cluster active site and found an [Fe_{4}S_{4}]-X-Cu-X-Ni centre which is highly unusual in biology. This structural representation consisted of a [Fe_{4}S_{4}] unit bridged to a binuclear centre, where Ni(II) resided in the distal position (denoted as Ni_{d}) in a square-planar conformation and a Cu(I) ion resided in the proximal position in a distorted tetrahedral position with ligands of unknown identity.

The debate towards the absolute structure and identity of the metals in the A-cluster active site of ACS continued, with a competing model presented. The authors suggested two different forms of the ACS enzyme, an "Open" form and a "Closed" form, with different metals occupying the proximal metal site (denoted as M_{p}) for each form. The general scheme of the enzyme followed closely with the first study's findings, but this new structure proposed a nickel ion in the "open" form and a zinc ion in the "closed" form.

A later review article attempted to reconcile the different observations of M_{p} and stated that this proximal position in the active site of ACS was prone to substitution and could contain any one of Cu, Zn and Ni. The three forms of this A-cluster most likely hold a small amount of Ni and a relatively larger amount of Cu.

=== Present (2014 onwards) ===
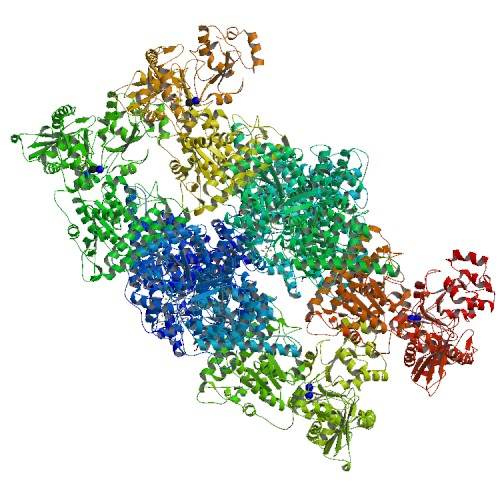
Bifunctional CODH/ACS unit in M.thermoacetica

It is now generally accepted that the ACS active site (A-cluster) is a Ni-Ni metal centre with both nickels having a +2 oxidation state. The [Fe_{4}S_{4}] cluster is bridged to the closer nickel, N_{p} which is connected via a thiolate bridge to the farther nickel, Ni_{d}. Ni_{d} is coordinated to two cysteine molecules and two backbone amide compounds, and is in a square-planar coordination. The space next to the metal can accommodate substrates and products. Ni_{p} is in a T-shaped environment bound to three sulfur atoms, with an unknown ligand possibly creating a distorted tetrahedral environment. This ligand has been hypothesized to be a water molecule or an acetyl group in the surrounding area in the cell. Although the proximal nickel is labile and can be replaced with a Cu of Zn centre, experimental evidence suggests that activity of ACS is limited to the presence of nickel only. In addition, some studies have shown that copper can even inhibit the enzyme under certain conditions.

The overall structure of the CODH/ACS enzyme consists of the CODH enzyme as a dimer at the centre with two ACS subunits on each side. The CODH core is made up of two Ni-Fe-S clusters (C-cluster), two [Fe_{4}S_{4}] clusters (B-cluster) and one [Fe_{4}S_{4}] D-cluster. The D-cluster bridges the two subunits with one C and one B cluster in each monomer, allowing rapid electron transfer. The A-cluster of ACS is in constant communication with the C-cluster in CODH. This active site is also responsible for the C-C and C-S bond formations in the product acetyl-CoA (and its reverse reaction).

Furthermore, the crystal structures of the CODH/ACS complex of Carboxydothermus hydrogenoformans and Clostridium autoethanogenum have been solved. While the latter shows a more extended arrangement of the ACS subunits, the complex of C. hydrogenoformans is very similar to that of M. thermoacetica.

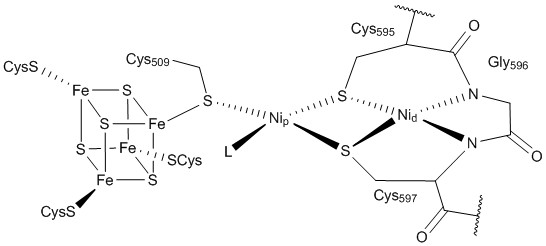
Acetyl-CoA Synthase active site structure

The ACS enzyme contains three main subunits. The first is the active site itself with the NiFeS centre. The second is the portion that directly interacts with CODH in the Wood–Ljungdahl pathway. This part is made up of α-helices that go into a Rossmann fold. It also appears to interact with a ferredoxin compound which may activate the subunit during the CO transferring process from CODH to ACS. The final domain binds CoA and consists of six arginine residues with a tryptophan molecule.

Experiments between the C-cluster of CODH and the A-cluster of ACS reveal a long, hydrophobic channel connecting the two domains to allow for the transfer of carbon monoxide from CODH to ACS. This channel is most likely to protect the carbon monoxide molecules from the outside environment of the enzyme and to increase efficiency of acetyl-CoA production.

==== Conformational changes ====
Studies in literature have been able to isolate the CODH/ACS enzyme in an "open" and "closed" configuration. This has led to the hypothesis that it undergoes four conformational changes depending on its activity. With the "open" position, the active site rotates itself to interact with the CFeSP protein in the methyl transfer step of the Wood–Ljungdahl pathway. The "closed" position opens up the channel between CODH and ACS to allow for the transfer of CO. These two configurations are opposite one another in that access to CO blocks off interaction with CFeSP, and when methylation occurs, the active site is buried and does not allow CO transfer. A second "closed" position is needed to block off water from the reaction. Finally, the A-cluster must be rotated once more to allow for the binding of CoA and release of the product. The exact trigger of these structural changes and the mechanistic details have yet to be resolved.

== Activity ==
=== Mechanism ===
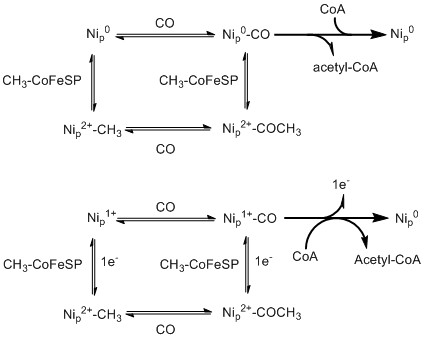
Proposed diamagnetic (top) and paramagnetic (bottom) mechanisms. Adapted from Seravalli et al.

Two competing mechanisms have been proposed for the formation of acetyl-CoA, the "paramagnetic mechanism" and the "diamagnetic mechanism". Both are similar in terms of the binding of substrates and the general steps, but differ in the oxidation state of the metal centre. Ni_{p} is believed to be the substrate binding centre which undergoes redox. The farther nickel centre and the [Fe_{4}S_{4}] cluster are not thought to be involved in the process.

In the paramagnetic mechanism, some type of complex (ferrodoxin, for example) activates the Ni_{p} atom, reducing it from Ni^{2+} to Ni^{1+}. The nickel then binds to either carbon monoxide from CODH or the methyl group donated by the CFeSP protein in no particular order. This is followed by migratory insertion to form an intermediate complex. CoA then binds to the metal and the final product, acetyl-CoA, is formed. Some criticisms of this mechanism are that it is unbalanced in terms of electron count and the activated Ni^{1+} intermediate cannot be detected with electron paramagnetic resonance. Furthermore, there is evidence of the ACS catalytic cycle without any external reducing complex, which refutes the ferrodoxin activation step.

The second proposed mechanism, the diamagnetic mechanism, involves a Ni^{0} intermediate instead of a Ni^{1+}. After addition of the methyl group and carbon monoxide, followed by insertion to produce the metal-acetyl complex, CoA attacks to produce the final product. The order in which the carbon monoxide molecule and the methyl group bind to the nickel centre has been highly debated, but no solid evidence has demonstrated preference for one over the other. Although this mechanism is electronically balanced, the idea of a Ni^{0} species is highly unprecedented in biology. There has also been no solid evidence supporting the presence of a zerovalent Ni species. However, similar nickel species to ACS with a Ni^{0} centre have been made, so the diamagnetic mechanism is not an implausible hypothesis.
