= Carbon monoxide dehydrogenase =

Class of enzymes

carbon-monoxide dehydrogenase (acceptor)

Identifiers
- EC no.: 1.2.7.4
- CAS no.: 64972-88-9

Databases
- BRENDA: enzyme data
- ExPASy: NiceZyme view
- KEGG: enzyme entry
- MetaCyc: metabolic pathway
- Rhea: reactions
- PDB structures: RCSB PDB PDBe PDBsum
- Gene Ontology: AmiGO / QuickGO
Search
- PMC: articles
- PubMed: articles
- NCBI: proteins

In enzymology, carbon monoxide dehydrogenase (CODH) (EC 1.2.7.4) is an enzyme that catalyzes the chemical reaction

CO + H_{2}O + A $\rightleftharpoons$ CO_{2} + AH_{2}

The chemical process catalyzed by carbon monoxide dehydrogenase is similar to the water-gas shift reaction.

The 3 substrates of this enzyme are CO, H_{2}O, and A, whereas its two products are CO_{2} and AH_{2}.

A variety of electron donors/receivers (Shown as "A" and "AH_{2}" in the reaction equation above) are observed in micro-organisms which utilize CODH. Several examples of electron transfer cofactors have been proposed, including Ferredoxin, NADP+/NADPH and flavoprotein complexes like flavin adenine dinucleotide (FAD) as well as hydrogenases. CODHs support the metabolisms of diverse prokaryotes, including methanogens, aerobic carboxidotrophs, acetogens, sulfate-reducers, and hydrogenogenic bacteria. The bidirectional reaction catalyzed by CODH plays a role in the carbon cycle allowing organisms to both make use of CO as a source of energy and utilize CO_{2} as a source of carbon. CODH can form a monofunctional enzyme, as is the case in Rhodospirillum rubrum, or can form a cluster with acetyl-CoA synthase as has been shown in Moorella thermoacetica. When acting in concert, either as structurally independent enzymes or in a bifunctional CODH/ACS unit, the two catalytic sites are key to carbon fixation in the reductive acetyl-CoA pathway. Microbial organisms (Both aerobic and anaerobic) encode and synthesize CODH for the purpose of carbon fixation (CO oxidation and CO_{2} reduction). Depending on attached accessory proteins (A,B,C,D-Clusters), serve a variety of catalytic functions, including reduction of [4Fe-4S] clusters and insertion of nickel.

This enzyme belongs to the family of oxidoreductases, specifically those acting on the aldehyde or oxo group of donor with other acceptors. The systematic name of this enzyme class is carbon-monoxide:acceptor oxidoreductase. Other names in common use include anaerobic carbon monoxide dehydrogenase, carbon monoxide oxygenase, carbon-monoxide dehydrogenase, and carbon-monoxide:(acceptor) oxidoreductase.

== Diversity ==
CODH are a rather diverse group of enzymes, containing two unrelated types of CODH. A copper-molybdenum flavoenzymes is found in some aerobic carboxydotrophic bacteria. Anaerobic bacteria utilize nickel-iron based CODHs. Both classes of CODH catalyze the conversion of carbon monoxide (CO) to carbon dioxide (CO_{2}). Only the Ni containing CODH is able to also catalyze the back reaction. CODHs exist in both monofunctional and bifunctional forms. An example for the latter case, Ni,Fe-CODHs form a bifunctional cluster with acetyl-CoA synthase, as has been well characterized in the anaerobic bacteria Moorella thermoacetica, Clostridium autoethanogenum and Carboxydothermus hydrogenoformans . While the ACS subunits of the complex of C. autoethanogenum show a rather extended arrangement those of the M. thermoacetica and C. hydrogenoformans complex are closer to the CODH subunits forming a tight tunnel network connecting cluster C and cluster A.

=== Ni,Fe-CODH ===
Nickel containing CODH (Ni,Fe-CODH) can be further divided into structural clades, dependent on their phylogenetic relationship

== Structure ==
Structure of CODH/ACS in M.thermoacetica. Alpha (ACS) and beta (CODH) subunits are shown. (1)The A-cluster Ni-[4Fe-4S]. (2)C-cluster Ni-[3Fe-4S]. (3) B-Cluster [4Fe-4S]. (4) D-cluster [4Fe-4S]. Designed from PDB: 3I01

=== Ni,Fe-CODH ===
Homodimeric Ni,Fe-CODHs contain five-metal clusters. They exist either in a homodimeric form (also called monofunctional) or in a bifunctional α_{2}β_{2}-tetrameric complex with acetyl-CoA synthase (ACS).

==== Monofunctional ====
The best studied monofunctional CODHs are those of Desulfovibrio vulgaris, Rhodospirillum rubrum and Carboxydothermus hydrogenoformans. They are homodimers of around 130 kDa sharing a central [4Fe-4S]-cluster at the surface of the protein - cluster D. The electrons are probably transferred to another [4Fe-4S]-cluster (cluster B) located 10 A inside the protein and from there to the active site - cluster C, being an [Ni-4Fe-4S]-cluster.

==== Bifunctional ====
The CODH/ACS complex is an α_{2}β_{2} tetrameric enzyme. The structures of CODH/ACS complexes of the anaerobic bacteria Moorella thermoacetica, Clostridium autoethanogenum and Carboxydothermus hydrogenoformans have been solved. The two CODH subunits form the central core of the enzyme to which an ACS subunit is attached at each side. Each α unit contains a single metal cluster. Together, the two β units contains five clusters of three types. CODH catalytic activity occurs at the Ni-[3Fe-4S] C-clusters while the interior [4Fe-4S] B and D clusters transfer electrons away from the C-cluster to external electron carriers such as ferredoxin. The ACS activity occurs in A-cluster located in the outer two α units.

All CODH/ACS complexes have a gas tunnel connecting the multiple active sites, while the tunnel system in the C. autoethanogenum enzyme is comparatively open and those of M. thermoacetica and C. hydrogenoformans rather tight. For the Moorella enzyme the rate of acetyl-CoA synthase activity from CO_{2} is not affected by the addition of hemoglobin, which would compete for CO in bulk solution, and isotopic labeling studies show that carbon monoxide derived from the C-cluster is preferentially used at the A-cluster over unlabeled CO in solution. Protein engineering of the CODH/ACS in M.thermoacetica revealed that mutating residues, so as to functionally block the tunnel, stopped acetyl-CoA synthesis when only CO_{2} was present. The discovery of a functional CO tunnel places CODH on a growing list of enzymes that independently evolved this strategy to transfer reactive intermediates from one active site to another.

== Reaction mechanisms ==
=== Ni,Fe-CODH ===
The CODH catalytic site, referred to as the C-cluster, is a [3Fe-4S] cluster bonded to a Ni-Fe moiety. Two basic amino acids (Lys587 and His 113 in M.thermoacetica) reside in proximity to the C-cluster and facilitate acid-base chemistry required for enzyme activity. Furthermore, other residues (i.e. an isoleucine apical to the Ni atom) fine-tune the binding and conversion of CO. Based on IR spectra suggesting the presence of an Ni-CO complex, the proposed first step in the oxidative catalysis of CO to CO_{2} involves the binding of CO to Ni^{2+} and corresponding complexing of Fe^{2+} to a water molecule.

It has been proposed that CO binds to square-planar nickel where it converts to a carboxy bridge between the Ni and Fe atom. A decarboxylation leads to the release of CO_{2} and the reduction of the cluster.

The electrons in the reduced C-cluster are transferred to nearby B and D [4Fe-4S] clusters, returning the Ni-[3Fe-4S] C-cluster to an oxidized state and reducing the single electron carrier ferredoxin.

Given CODH's role in CO_{2} fixation, the reductive mechanism is sometimes inferred as the “direct reverse” of the oxidative mechanism by the ”principle of microreversibility.”

== Environmental relevance ==
Carbon monoxide dehydrogenase regulates atmospheric CO and CO_{2} levels. Anaerobic micro-organisms like Acetogens use the Wood–Ljungdahl pathway, relying on CODH to reduce CO_{2} to CO, needed along with a methyl, coenzyme a (CoA) and corrinoid iron-sulfur protein for the synthesis of Acetyl-CoA. Other types show CODH being utilized to generate a proton motive force for the purposes of energy generation. CODH is used for the CO oxidation, producing two protons which are subsequently reduced to form dihydrogen (H_{2}.
