= Arla Foods UK =

British dairy products subsidiary

Arla Foods Ltd.
- Trade name: Arla UK
- Type: Subsidiary
- Founded: 2003; 23 years ago
- Headquarters: Leeds, United Kingdom
- Area served: United Kingdom
- Products: Dairy products – Lurpak, Cravendale, Lactofree
- Revenue: ▲£2,620 million (2018)
- Number of employees: 3,460
- Parent: Arla Foods
- Website: www.arlafoods.co.uk

Arla Foods Ltd. is a major dairy products company in the United Kingdom, based in Leeds, and a subsidiary of Arla Foods, which is owned by its farmer owners.

== History ==
The company was created by the merger in 1980 of the British dairy group Express Dairies and the British subsidiary of Arla Foods, a Swedish-Danish dairy production co operative, jointly owned by Swedish and Danish farmers. The parent company, Arla Foods Amba, initially held a 51% stake, but acquired the rest of the company's shares in April 2007.

In Britain, Arla supplies milk to retailers, such as Asda's own brand farmer's milk, and owns many household brands including Lurpak, Anchor Butter, Cravendale, Lactofree and Castello.

According to the BBC, in August 2015, farmers were paid less per pint of milk by Arla than by supermarkets that buy directly.

In August 2021, people acting on behalf of Animal Rebellion blockaded Arla's dairy facility in Aylesbury, citing the large climate and ecological burden of dairy production compared to plant-based alternatives. The same site was again blockaded in September 2022.

In November 2024, Arla, and Müller became subject to a boycott by some consumers, after Arla Foods announced that they would add the product Bovaer (3-Nitrooxypropanol, main ingredient (is manufactured by DSM-Fermenich) to the cattle feed of some of their cows as a trial to reduce methane emissions. The boycott, according to Arla, and The Grocer, is down to misinformation over the safety of Bovaer and its claimed links to Bill Gates, which has been misattributed to different company in the same industry which Bill Gates has invested into (Gates' invested in the competing product 'Rumin8'). In response to the announcement, the Soil Association said that 3-Nitrooxypropanol would not be classed as an organic ingredient.

== Products ==
Arla is the largest supplier of fresh milk and cream in the United Kingdom, producing over 2.2 billion litres of milk per year. It produces two premium milk brands: Cravendale filtered milk, which undergoes a filtration process to remove bacteria before pasteurization; and Lactofree milk, from which lactose is removed, making it suitable for most lactose intolerant people. Lactofree was launched in January 2006, and is available in the United Kingdom. Arla began licensing its lactose removing patent to other producers, in September 2010. Up to September 2010, Lactofree had seen growth by 37% year on year. As of July 2021, Lactofree is worth 70.8% of the UK's lactose free milk market. Following the success of Lactofree milk, Arla introduced a range of lactose-free products, including cheese and yoghurt.

As well as fresh milk, Arla produces butter under its popular brands Anchor and Lurpak. In 2017, Arla made the decision to switch to British dairy from imported New Zealand dairy for its Anchor brand. Lurpak continues to utilise imported dairy from Denmark, where the bulk of Arla's farms are located. Other products include fromage frais, yoghurts (Skyr yogurt) and the blue cheeses Rosenborg and Danish Blue. The firm also produces fruit juice.

== Locations ==
The company has processing plants in England at Palmers Green (London), Stourton (Leeds), Settle (North Yorkshire) and Malpas (Cheshire), and in Scotland at Lockerbie. In January 2009, Arla ceased production at its dairy in Manchester. The company also operates the world's largest milk processing plant in Aylesbury, which was opened on 24 May 2014.

Arla Foods obtained the Westbury Dairies plant in January 2016, in Westbury, Wiltshire, which has become a site for the production of Anchor butter.

Arla Foods briefly operated the Milk Link dairy in Crediton, Devon following the merger with Milk Link in 2012. However was sold in a management buyout in April 2013 with the Crediton operations being renamed as Crediton Dairy Limited.
