= 2-hydroxypropyl-CoM lyase =

Class of enzymes

Identifiers
- EC no.: 4.4.1.23
- CAS no.: 244301-07-3

Databases
- IntEnz: IntEnz view
- BRENDA: BRENDA entry
- ExPASy: NiceZyme view
- KEGG: KEGG entry
- MetaCyc: metabolic pathway
- PRIAM: profile
- PDB structures: RCSB PDB PDBe PDBsum
Search
- PMC: articles
- PubMed: articles
- NCBI: proteins

The enzyme 2-hydroxypropyl-CoM lyase (EC 4.4.1.23, epoxyalkane:coenzyme M transferase, epoxyalkane:CoM transferase, epoxyalkane:2-mercaptoethanesulfonate transferase, coenzyme M-epoxyalkane ligase, epoxyalkyl:CoM transferase, epoxypropane:coenzyme M transferase, epoxypropyl:CoM transferase, EaCoMT, 2-hydroxypropyl-CoM:2-mercaptoethanesulfonate lyase (epoxyalkane-ring-forming), (R)-2-hydroxypropyl-CoM 2-mercaptoethanesulfonate lyase (cyclizing, (R)-1,2-epoxypropane-forming)) is an enzyme with systematic name (R)-[or (S)]-2-hydroxypropyl-CoM:2-mercaptoethanesulfonate lyase (epoxyalkane-ring-forming). This enzyme catalyses the following reaction:

(1) (R)-2-hydroxypropyl-CoM $\rightleftharpoons$ (R)-1,2-epoxypropane + HS-CoM
(2) (S)-2-hydroxypropyl-CoM $\rightleftharpoons$ (S)-1,2-epoxypropane + HS-CoM

This enzyme requires zinc.
