= ACSE =

ACSE may refer to:

- Association Control Service Element, OSI method
- 5-methyltetrahydrofolate:corrinoid/iron-sulfur protein Co-methyltransferase, an enzyme
- Automatic Control and Systems Engineering Department at the University of Sheffield, UK
- Annual Christmas Shopping Extravaganza Watertown, MA
