= Mtaa =

Mtaa may refer to:

- Mtaa (settlement)
- (Methyl-Co(III) methanol-specific corrinoid protein):coenzyme M methyltransferase, an enzyme
- M.River & T.Whid Art Associates
