= CoB—CoM heterodisulfide reductase =

Identifiers
- EC no.: 1.8.98.1
- CAS no.: 116515-35-6

Databases
- IntEnz: IntEnz view
- BRENDA: BRENDA entry
- ExPASy: NiceZyme view
- KEGG: KEGG entry
- MetaCyc: metabolic pathway
- PRIAM: profile
- PDB structures: RCSB PDB PDBe PDBsum
- Gene Ontology: AmiGO / QuickGO
Search
- PMC: articles
- PubMed: articles
- NCBI: proteins

In enzymology, a CoB—CoM heterodisulfide reductase (EC 1.8.98.1) is an enzyme that catalyzes the chemical reaction

coenzyme B + coenzyme M + methanophenazine $\rightleftharpoons$ N-{7-[(2-sulfoethyl)dithio]heptanoyl}-O_{3}-phospho-L-threonine + dihydromethanophenazine

The 3 substrates of this enzyme are coenzyme B, coenzyme M, and methanophenazine, whereas its two products are [[N-{7-[(2-sulfoethyl)dithio]heptanoyl}-O_{3}-phospho-L-threonine]] and dihydromethanophenazine.

This enzyme belongs to the family of oxidoreductases, specifically those acting on a sulfur group of donors with other, known, acceptors. The systematic name of this enzyme class is coenzyme B:coenzyme M:methanophenazine oxidoreductase. Other names in common use include heterodisulfide reductase, and soluble heterodisulfide reductase. This enzyme participates in folate biosynthesis.
