= Sulfopyruvate decarboxylase =

Class of enzymes

Identifiers
- EC no.: 4.1.1.79

Databases
- BRENDA: enzyme data
- ExPASy: NiceZyme view
- KEGG: enzyme entry
- MetaCyc: metabolic pathway
- Rhea: reactions
- PDB structures: RCSB PDB PDBe PDBsum
- Gene Ontology: AmiGO / QuickGO
Search
- PMC: articles
- PubMed: articles
- NCBI: proteins

The enzyme sulfopyruvate decarboxylase (EC 4.1.1.79), characterised from Methanococcus jannaschii, catalyzes the decarboxylation of 3-sulfopyruvic acid to sulfoacetaldehyde and carbon dioxide:

3-sulfopyruvic acid
CO_{2}
sulfoacetaldehyde

Thiamine pyrophosphate is used as a cofactor and the reaction is part of the biosynthetic pathway to coenzyme M.

This enzyme is a lyase, specifically a carboxy-lyase, which cleave carbon-carbon bonds. The systematic name of this enzyme class is 3-sulfopyruvate carboxy-lyase (2-sulfoacetaldehyde-forming). This enzyme is also called sulfopyruvate carboxy-lyase.
