= 2-phosphosulfolactate phosphatase =

Class of enzymes

Identifiers
- EC no.: 3.1.3.71

Databases
- BRENDA: enzyme data
- ExPASy: NiceZyme view
- KEGG: enzyme entry
- MetaCyc: metabolic pathway
- Rhea: reactions
- PDB structures: RCSB PDB PDBe PDBsum
- Gene Ontology: AmiGO / QuickGO
Search
- PMC: articles
- PubMed: articles
- NCBI: proteins

The enzyme 2-phosphosulfolactate phosphatase (EC 3.1.3.71) catalyzes the reaction

(2R)-O-phospho-3-sulfolactic acid
H_{2}O
P_{i}
(R)-2-hydroxy-3-sulfopropanoic acid

The enzyme characterised from Methanococcus jannaschii, hydrolyses (2R)-O-phospho-3-sulfolactic acid to (R)-2-hydroxy-3-sulfopropanoic acid and orthophosphate (P_{i}). The reaction is part of the biosynthesis of coenzyme M in this archaeal methanogen.

This enzyme is a hydrolase, specifically one acting on phosphoric monoester bonds. The systematic name (R)-2-phospho-3-sulfolactate phosphohydrolase. Other names in use include (2R)-phosphosulfolactate phosphohydrolase, and ComB phosphatase.

== Structural studies ==
As of late 2007, only one structure has been solved for this class of enzymes, with the PDB accession code PDB: 1VR0.
