= 2-oxopropyl-CoM reductase (carboxylating) =

Class of enzymes

Identifiers
- EC no.: 1.8.1.5

Databases
- IntEnz: IntEnz view
- BRENDA: BRENDA entry
- ExPASy: NiceZyme view
- KEGG: KEGG entry
- MetaCyc: metabolic pathway
- PRIAM: profile
- PDB structures: RCSB PDB PDBe PDBsum
- Gene Ontology: AmiGO / QuickGO
Search
- PMC: articles
- PubMed: articles
- NCBI: proteins

2-oxopropyl-CoM reductase (carboxylating) (EC 1.8.1.5) is an enzyme that catalyzes the chemical reaction

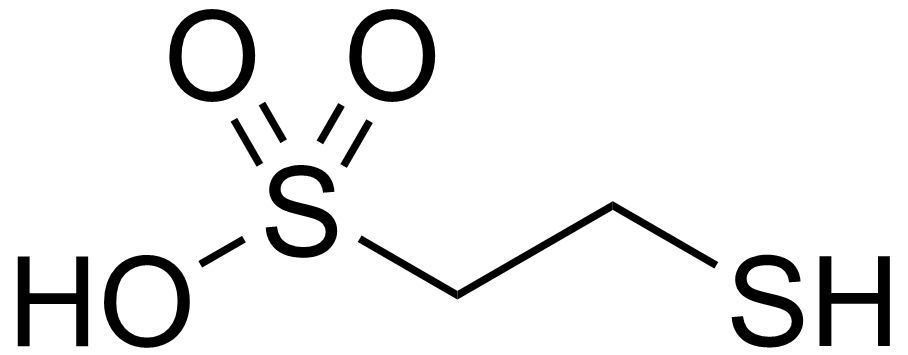
Coenzyme M
+ NADP^{+} +
acetoacetic acid
CO_{2} + H^{+}
CO_{2} + H^{+}
2-acetylthioethanesulfonic acid
+ NADPH

The three substrates of this enzyme are 2-mercaptoethanesulfonic acid (Coenzyme M), acetoacetic acid, and nicotinamide adenine dinucleotide phosphate (NADP^{+}). Its products are 2-acetylthioethanesulfonic acid (2-oxopropyl-Coenzyme M), carbon dioxide, reduced NADPH, and a proton.

This enzyme belongs to the family of oxidoreductases, specifically those acting on a sulfur group of donors with NAD+ or NADP+ as acceptor. The systematic name of this enzyme class is 2-mercaptoethanesulfonate, acetoacetate:NADP+ oxidoreductase (decarboxylating). Other names in common use include NADPH:2-(2-ketopropylthio)ethanesulfonate, oxidoreductase/carboxylase, and NADPH:2-ketopropyl-coenzyme M oxidoreductase/carboxylase.

== Structural studies ==
As of late 2007, two structures have been solved for this class of enzymes, with PDB accession codes 2C3C and 2C3D.
