= Acetogen =

Microorganism producing acetate from CO2 and H2 through the reductive acetyl coenzyme A

An acetogen is a microorganism that generates acetate (CH_{3}COO^{−}) as an end product of either anaerobic respiration or fermentation. In a narrower sense, a homoacetogen is a bacterial or archaeal microorganism that performs anaerobic respiration and carbon fixation simultaneously through the reductive acetyl coenzyme A (acetyl-CoA) pathway – also known as the Wood-Ljungdahl pathway; they can produce acetyl-CoA (and from that, in most cases, acetate as the end product) from two molecules of carbon dioxide (CO_{2}) and four molecules of molecular hydrogen (H_{2}). This process is known as acetogenesis, and is different from acetate fermentation, although both occur in the absence of molecular oxygen (O_{2}) and produce acetate. Although previously thought that only bacteria are acetogens, some archaea can be considered to be acetogens.

Acetogens are found in a variety of habitats, generally those that are anaerobic (lack oxygen). Acetogens can use a variety of compounds as sources of energy and carbon; the best studied form of acetogenic metabolism involves the use of carbon dioxide as a carbon source and hydrogen as an energy source. Carbon dioxide reduction is carried out by the key enzyme acetyl-CoA synthase. Together with methane-forming archaea, acetogens constitute the last limbs in the anaerobic food web that leads to the production of methane from polymers in the absence of oxygen. Acetogens may represent ancestors of the first bioenergetically active cells in evolution.

== Metabolic roles ==
Acetogens have diverse metabolic roles, which help them thrive in different environments. One of their metabolic products is acetate which is an important nutrient for the host and its inhabiting microbial community, most seen in termite's guts. Acetogens also serve as "hydrogen sinks" in termite's GI tract. Hydrogen gas inhibits biodegradation and acetogens use up these hydrogen gases in the anaerobic environment to favor the biodegradative capacity of the host by reacting hydrogen gas and carbon dioxide to make acetate. Acetogens have the ability to use variety of substrates in an event where another competitor such as a methanogen makes hydrogen gas a limiting substrate. Acetogens can use and convert alcohols, lactates and fatty acids, which are usually restricted to syntrophs, instead of just carbon dioxide and hydrogen. This enables them to take on the roles of important contributors of food chain such as primary fermenters. Acetogens can work together with methanogens, as exemplified by the conversion of carbohydrates by a Methanosarcina barkeri and coculture of A. woodii. The methanogen takes up acetate to favor the acetogen. Sometimes the interspecies transfer of hydrogen gas between A. woodii and an H_{2}-consuming methanogen results in hydrogen gas being released from the acetogen instead of going toward acetogenesis by the Wood–Ljungdahl pathway. Acetogens are also one of the contributors to corrosion of steel. Acetobacterium woodii utilize hydrogen gas and CO_{2} to make the acetate that is used as carbon source for many of the sulfate-reducing bacteria growing with hydrogen gas and sulfate.
