= Coenzyme-B sulfoethylthiotransferase =

Class of enzymes

coenzyme-B sulfoethylthiotransferase

Identifiers
- EC no.: 2.8.4.1

Databases
- IntEnz: IntEnz view
- BRENDA: BRENDA entry
- ExPASy: NiceZyme view
- KEGG: KEGG entry
- MetaCyc: metabolic pathway
- PRIAM: profile
- PDB structures: RCSB PDB PDBe PDBsum
- Gene Ontology: AmiGO / QuickGO
Search
- PMC: articles
- PubMed: articles
- NCBI: proteins

In enzymology, coenzyme-B sulfoethylthiotransferase, also known as methyl-coenzyme M reductase (MCR) or most systematically as 2-(methylthio)ethanesulfonate:N-(7-thioheptanoyl)-3-O-phosphothreonine S-(2-sulfoethyl)thiotransferase is an enzyme that catalyzes the final step in the formation of methane. It does so by combining the hydrogen donor coenzyme B and the methyl donor coenzyme M. Via this enzyme, most of the natural gas on earth was produced. Ruminants (e.g. cows) produce methane because their rumens contain methanogenic prokaryotes (Archaea) that encode and express the set of genes of this enzymatic complex.

The enzyme has two active sites, each occupied by the nickel-containing F_{430} cofactor.

+ ⇌ CoM-S-S-CoB + methane

Structure of 2-mercaptoethanesulfonate (coenzyme M: reacts after methylation on the thiol)

Structure of N-(7-mercaptoheptanoyl)threonine 3-O-phosphate (coenzyme B)

The two substrates of this enzyme are 2-(methylthio)ethanesulfonate and N-(7-mercaptoheptanoyl)threonine 3-O-phosphate; its two products are CoM-S-S-CoB and methane. 3-Nitrooxypropanol inhibits the enzyme.

In some species, the enzyme reacts in reverse (a process called reverse methanogenesis), catalysing the anaerobic oxidation of methane, therefore removing it from the environment. Such organisms are methanotrophs.

This enzyme belongs to the family of transferases, specifically those transferring alkylthio groups.

== Structure ==
Coenzyme-B sulfoethylthiotransferase is a multiprotein complex made up of a pair of identical halves. Each half is made up of three subunits: α, β and γ, also called McrA, McrB and McrG, respectively.
