= Wood–Ljungdahl pathway =

Set of biochemical reactions used by some bacteria

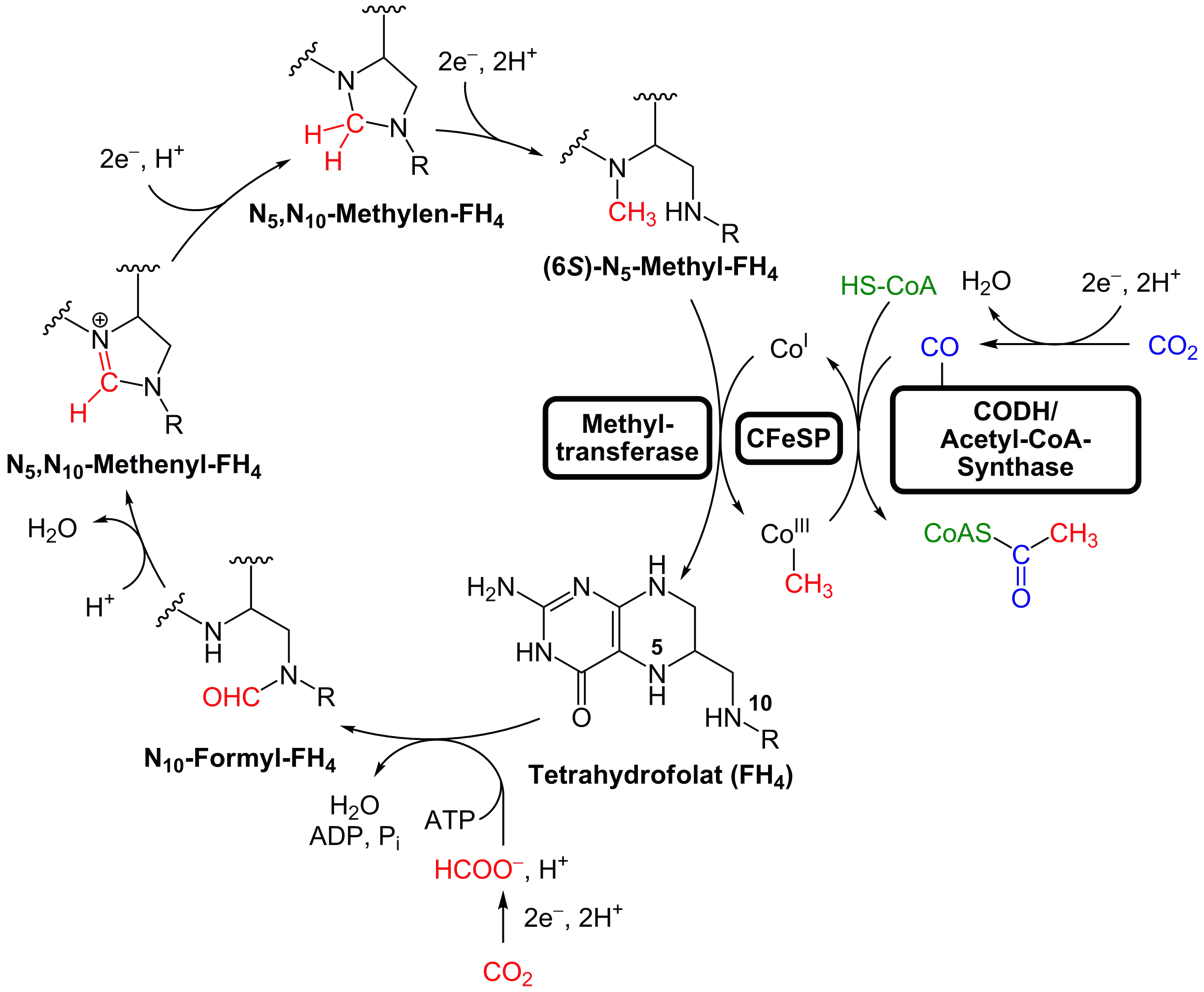
The reductive acetyl-CoA pathway

The Wood–Ljungdahl pathway is a set of biochemical reactions used by some bacteria. It is also known as the reductive acetyl-coenzyme A (acetyl-CoA) pathway. This pathway enables these organisms to use hydrogen (H_{2}) as an electron donor, and carbon dioxide (CO_{2}) as an electron acceptor and as a building block to generate acetate for biosynthesis.

In this pathway carbon dioxide is reduced to carbon monoxide (CO) and formic acid (HCOOH) or directly into a formyl group (R−CH=O), the formyl group is reduced to a methyl group (−CH_{3}) and then combined with the carbon monoxide and coenzyme A to produce acetyl-CoA. Two specific enzymes participate on the carbon monoxide side of the pathway: CO dehydrogenase and acetyl-CoA synthase. The former catalyzes the reduction of the CO_{2} and the latter combines the resulting CO with a methyl group to give acetyl-CoA.

Some anaerobic bacteria use the Wood–Ljungdahl pathway in reverse to break down acetate. For example, sulfate-reducing bacteria (SRB) transform acetate completely into CO_{2} and H_{2} coupled with the reduction of sulfate to sulfide. When operating in the reverse direction, the acetyl-CoA synthase is sometimes called acetyl-CoA decarbonylase.

An evolutionarily related but biochemically distinct pathway named the Wolfe Cycle occurs exclusively in some archaea called methanogens. In these anaerobic archaea, the Wolfe Cycle functions as a methanogenesis pathway to reduce CO_{2} into methane (CH_{4}) with electron donors such as hydrogen (H_{2}) and formate (HCOO^{–}).

== Evolution ==
=== Relevance to abiogenesis ===
It has been proposed that the reductive acetyl-CoA pathway might have begun at deep sea alkaline hydrothermal vents where metal sulfides and transition metals catalyze the prebiotic reactions of the reductive acetyl-CoA pathway. Recent experiments have tried to replicate this pathway by attempting to reduce CO_{2}, with very little pyruvate observed using native iron (Fe^{0}, zerovalent Fe) as a reducing agent (< 30 μM), and even less so under hydrothermal settings with H_{2} (10 μM). Joseph Moran and colleagues state that "it has been proposed that either the complete or “horseshoe” forms of the rTCA cycle may have once been united with the acetyl CoA pathway in an ancestral, possibly prebiotic, carbon fixation network".

=== Last universal common ancestor ===
A 2016 study of the genomes of a set of bacteria and archaea suggested that the last universal common ancestor (LUCA) of all cells was using an ancient Wood–Ljungdahl pathway in a hydrothermal setting, but more recent work challenges this conclusion as they argued that the previous study had "undersampled protein families, resulting in incomplete phylogenetic trees which do not reflect protein family evolution". However geological evidence and phylogenomic reconstructions of the metabolic network of the common ancestors of archaea and bacteria support that LUCA fixed CO_{2} and relied on H_{2}.

== Historical references ==
- Ljungdahl LG (1969). "Total synthesis of acetate from CO_{2} by heterotrophic bacteria". Annual Review of Microbiology. 23 (1): 515–38. doi:10.1146/annurev.mi.23.100169.002503. PMID 4899080.
- Ljungdahl LG (1986). "The autotrophic pathway of acetate synthesis in acetogenic bacteria". Annual Review of Microbiology. 40 (1): 415–50. doi:10.1146/annurev.micro.40.1.415. PMID 3096193.
- Ljungdahl LG (2009). "A life with acetogens, thermophiles, and cellulolytic anaerobes". Annual Review of Microbiology. 63 (1): 1–25. doi:10.1146/annurev.micro.091208.073617. PMID 19575555.

== See also ==
- Calvin-Benson-Bassham cycle
- Carbon fixation
- Carbon monoxide dehydrogenase
- Syngas fermentation
- Methanogenesis
