= 3-Nitrooxypropanol =

Names
- Preferred IUPAC name 3-Hydroxypropyl nitrate
- Other names Bovaer, 3-NOP, 3NOP, abrucomstat

Identifiers
| CAS Number | 100502-66-7 |
| 3D model (JSmol) | Interactive image |
| ChEMBL | ChEMBL1817841 |
| ChemSpider | 8187468 |
| ECHA InfoCard | 100.225.103 |
| EC Number | 695-997-8 |
| PubChem CID | 10011893 |
| UNII | 582N19CWP9 |
| CompTox Dashboard (EPA) | DTXSID10760800 |
- InChI: InChI=1S/C3H7NO4/c5-2-1-3-8-4(6)7/h5H,1-3H2 Key: PTMLFFXFTRSBJW-UHFFFAOYSA-N
- SMILES: C(CO)CO[N+](=O)[O-]

Properties
| Chemical formula | C_{3}H_{7}NO_{4} |
| Molar mass | 121.092 g·mol^{−1} |
| Appearance | Colorless liquid |
| Density | 1.12 g/cm^{3} |
| Melting point | −20 °C (−4 °F; 253 K) |
| Boiling point | 120 °C (248 °F; 393 K) |
| Solubility in water | Soluble |

Hazards
- Occupational safety and health (OHS/OSH)
| Main hazards | Irritant to skin and eyes, harmful if inhaled |
- GHS labelling
| Pictograms | (GHS02: Flammable) (GHS05: Corrosive) (GHS07: Exclamation mark) (GHS08: Health hazard) |
| Signal word | Danger |
| Hazard statements | H242, H302, H315, H318, H319, H335, H361 |
| Precautionary statements | P203, P210, P234, P240, P261, P264, P264+P265, P270, P271, P280, P301+P317, P302+P352, P304+P340, P305+P351+P338, P305+P354+P338, P317, P318, P319, P321, P330, P332+P317, P337+P317, P362+P364, P370+P378, P403, P403+P233, P405, P410, P411, P420, P501 |
- Except where otherwise noted, data are given for materials in their standard state (at 25 °C [77 °F], 100 kPa). Infobox references

3-Nitrooxypropanol (abbreviated as 3-NOP or 3NOP, commercially known as Bovaer) is a synthetic organic compound with the formula HOCH_{2}CH_{2}CH_{2}ONO_{2}. It is the mononitrate ester of 1,3-propanediol and acts as an enzyme inhibitor that specifically targets methyl coenzyme M reductase (MCR), the enzyme that catalyzes the final step of methanogenesis in microbes living in the digestive system of ruminants, such as cows and sheep.

When added to the feed of ruminant animals, it significantly lowers methane emissions by inhibiting the activity of MCR without being incorporated into milk or meat. It causes a slight increase in feed conversion without affecting raw yields. Studies have demonstrated that methane output is lowered by 30%.

== Description ==
DSM has patented and commercialized 3-NOP as a methane inhibitor for production animals under the brand name Bovaer, a feed additive. The formulation consists of silicon dioxide (60% w/w), propylene glycol, and 3-nitrooxypropanol (10% w/w).

== History ==
The development of Bovaer began in 2010 as part of the Clean Cow project initiated by DSM-Firmenich. This project aimed to address methane emissions from livestock, which are a major source of greenhouse gases. According to Maik Kindermann, head of research and development for the Bovaer project, the research commenced in 2008 with a focus on understanding the molecular mechanisms behind methane formation in ruminants.

The first successful trials were conducted in 2010 and over 40 trials were conducted to ensure efficacy and safety across different cattle diets and environments.

In 2021, Bovaer received its first approvals for use in Brazil and Chile, followed by authorization from the European Union for dairy cattle in 2022. The product was subsequently approved for use in Canada in early 2024 and received FDA approval for the U.S. market in May 2024. In April 2022, Elanco was granted exclusive licensing rights to develop and commercialize Bovaer in the United States. In June 2023, Elanco requested a consultation with the U.S. FDA's Center for Veterinary Medicine regarding Bovaer's drug status for use as a methane inhibitor in dairy cows. On May 24, 2024, the U.S. FDA concluded that Bovaer can lower methane production when used as labeled and poses a low risk to animals and humans under its sale conditions.

== Safety ==
The U.S. Food and Drug Administration (FDA) concluded that Bovaer meets safety and efficacy standards for use in lactating dairy cattle, stating that it does not negatively affect milk production or quality. Additionally, a scientific opinion by the European Food Safety Authority (EFSA) found that Bovaer is safe for dairy cows at the maximum recommended levels and poses no significant risk to consumer food safety or the environment.

3-NOP can be harmful if inhaled and is an irritant to the skin and eyes. Although concerns have been raised claiming a lack of long-term studies, three such studies do in fact exist as of November 2021 and were taken into account by the EFSA's regulatory analysis. Arla Foods has claimed that Bovaer will not affect milk quality or safety, as it is present in milk and meat only in trace amounts ; this too is supported by the EFSA review.

3-NOP is metabolized very quickly into compounds that are naturally present in the rumen of cows and the compound 3-NOPA in trace amounts.

== Reception ==
In November 2024, Arla Foods announced a collaborative trial involving major UK retailers such as Morrisons, Tesco and Aldi to test Bovaer on approximately 30 farms in the UK.

Despite the potential benefits, the trial has faced significant backlash from consumers who have called for a boycott of Arla's products, particularly Lurpak butter. Critics have expressed concerns over the safety and ethical implications of using additives like Bovaer in livestock feed.

Arla has defended the trial, asserting that Bovaer has been extensively tested and approved by regulatory bodies such as the European Food Safety Authority (EFSA) and the UK Food Standards Agency. The company insists that there will be no negative impact on animal health or milk quality during the trial.

=== Environmental impact ===
Bovaer aims to contribute to climate change mitigation by lowering enteric methane emissions from dairy cows. Studies indicate that feeding one tablespoon of Bovaer per lactating dairy cow per day can lead to a reduction of approximately 30% in methane emissions, which is equivalent to about 1.2 metric tons of carbon dioxide equivalent (CO2e) per cow annually.

A comprehensive study conducted in the Netherlands involving 150 dairy farms and over 20,000 cows demonstrated that Bovaer is more effective at higher dosages and when incorporated with corn in the cattle's diet. Additionally, trials in Italy reported methane reductions of up to 50% when Bovaer was administered daily to lactating cows. The European Food Safety Authority (EFSA) has concluded that Bovaer is safe for use in dairy cattle, with no significant adverse effects on milk production, composition, or animal health observed during trials. The product was also approved in several other countries, including Brazil, Chile, and Canada.

=== Financial incentives ===
Bovaer use could earn farmers credit through participation in voluntary carbon markets and conservation programs, potentially yielding returns of $20 or more per lactating cow annually, according to one source. According to Elanco, about 50% of this return is expected to come from carbon marketplace participation through platforms like Athian or Truterra, which allows farmers to sell verified carbon credits generated by their methane reductions. In the U.S., approximately $89 million in grants from the USDA’s Regional Conservation Partnership Program (RCPP) has been allocated to support dairy producers implementing technologies like Bovaer to reduce methane emissions.

== Effects on milk ==
=== Milk production and composition ===
While the primary focus of 3-NOP research has been on methane reduction, its effects on milk production metrics have also been studied. Some studies report no appreciable effect on milk yield, while others report slight reductions in yield. A meta-analysis found that increasing levels of 3-NOP led to higher concentrations of milk fat and protein from cows supplemented with 3-NOP.

=== Feed efficiency ===
The introduction of 3-NOP has been associated with improved feed efficiency. Research indicates that cows supplemented with this compound exhibited better feed conversion rates, producing more milk fat or protein per unit of feed consumed.

Experimental studies indicate that 3-NOP is an effective feed additive for reducing methane emissions from dairy cows while maintaining or even enhancing certain aspects of milk production. Although some studies report a slight decrease in total milk yield, the increases in milk fat and protein concentrations suggest improved overall efficiency and quality of milk.

== Emissions data ==
The use of 3-nitrooxypropanol has been studied as a method to reduce enteric methane emissions from dairy cows. Enteric methane, a potent greenhouse gas, is a significant contributor to agricultural emissions. Research indicates that the administration of 3-NOP can decrease methane emissions by approximately 30%, equivalent to a reduction of about 1.2 metric tons of carbon dioxide equivalent (CO2e) per cow annually.

3-NOP has demonstrated efficacy in reducing methane emissions from dairy cows. In a study conducted at Penn State University, the addition of 3-NOP to the diet resulted in a 26% reduction in daily methane emissions, with similar findings reported across various trials. The compound works by inhibiting an enzyme used for methane synthesis in the rumen, thereby decreasing methane production without negatively impacting feed intake or overall lactational performance.

A meta-analysis encompassing data from multiple studies confirmed that 3-NOP supplementation results in at least a 30% decrease in enteric methane emissions.

== Society and culture ==
=== Conspiracy theory ===
In 2024, protests in the UK against the use of Bovaer have led some social media users to pour milk down sinks and toilets. An unfounded conspiracy theory circulated online, linking Bovaer to a supposed depopulation agenda involving Bill Gates. These unfounded claims have sparked backlash against Arla Foods, which is trialing Bovaer, and have prompted calls for product boycotts. Experts have clarified that Bovaer is safe and does not pose food safety risks, stating that the claims linking Gates to Bovaer are false. Despite this, the conspiracy theories persist, complicating public acceptance of the additive and the potential benefits in combating climate change. Reacting to concerns on social media Professor Alastair Hay, a professor emeritus of Environmental toxicology at the University of Leeds responded that "extensive tests on cancer risk indicate...that the doses approved presents no cancer risk," and that "the safety factor of some 170 between the dose at which some benign tumours were seen in rodents and the dose of the additive considered safe by the FSA. "Concluding that “Thus, there is no evidence to suggest that at the doses approved for use in animals that the additive is a risk to humans through consumption of milk.”

== See also ==
- FutureFeed – an algae-based feed additive that reduces methane emissions
- Elanco
- Sustainable agriculture
- Carbon credits
- Animal welfare
