= (Methyl-Co(III) tetramethylammonium-specific corrinoid protein):coenzyme M methyltransferase =

Class of enzymes

Identifiers
- EC no.: 2.1.1.253

Databases
- IntEnz: IntEnz view
- BRENDA: BRENDA entry
- ExPASy: NiceZyme view
- KEGG: KEGG entry
- MetaCyc: metabolic pathway
- PRIAM: profile
- PDB structures: RCSB PDB PDBe PDBsum
Search
- PMC: articles
- PubMed: articles
- NCBI: proteins

(Methyl-Co(III) tetramethylammonium-specific corrinoid protein):coenzyme M methyltransferase (EC 2.1.1.253, methyltransferase 2, mtqA (gene)) is an enzyme with systematic name methylated tetramethylammonium-specific corrinoid protein:coenzyme M methyltransferase. This enzyme catalyses the following chemical reaction

[methyl-Co(III) tetramethylammonium-specific corrinoid protein] + coenzyme M ⇌ methyl-CoM + [Co(I) tetramethylammonium-specific corrinoid protein]

This enzyme catalyses the transfer of a methyl group from a corrinoid protein.
