= Arla Oy =

Finnish food company

Arla Oy is one of the largest food manufacturers in Finland, holding a leading position in the dairy sector in Finland. It is a subsidiary of Danish-Swedish company Arla Foods.

== History ==
The group, incorporated in 1907, owns and operates production plants in Finland (Sipoo, Lapinjärvi, Kuusamo, Kitee and Urjala), Sweden (Åhus, formerly operated by Åhus Glass) and Lithuania (Mažeikiai). It has a comprehensive sales and distribution network in Finland as well as in the neighbouring markets of Sweden and the Baltic countries. The group head offices are located in Sipoo near Helsinki.

In 2003, Ingman sold part of its ice-cream operations to Nestlé, to be operated under Svenska Glasskiosken. In 2011 the remaining ice-cream operations were sold to Unilever, which in 2012 consolidated the Ingman brand under its general Algida/heart-shaped branding. Before the sale, Ingman Ice Cream had 2010 revenues of 70 M€, brands like Ingman, Kingis, Jättis, Totally, SuperViva, Åhus Glass and TofuLine, and 700 employees with facilities in Sipoo, Åhus, Mažeikiai and Gomel.

On November 8, 2006 Arla Foods bought one third of the Ingman Foods shares, with the option to buy the rest of the company, and the European Commission deemed the deal to be pro-competitive. The subsequent merger of Ingman into Arla made Arla the second biggest dairy business of Finland, although still far from Valio's dominant position. For a few years the market was then disrupted by a price war, as well as by marketing campaigns related to retailers' decision to carry Arla milk imported from Sweden. Valio was eventually fined 70 M€ in 2013, and the market stabilised afterwards.

== Operations ==
Arla operates dairy factories in Porlammi (Lapinjärvi) and in Söderkulla (Sipoo). The industrial area near Söderkulla is named after Arla and Unilever and the local sports arena is named after Ingman.
