= Mootral =

British–Swiss company

Mootral was a British–Swiss company that developed a food supplement to reduce methane emissions from ruminant animals, chiefly cows and sheep, but also goats. Methane is a major greenhouse gas. Mootral ceased operations in 2024

== Emission trading ==
Companies using Mootral's feed supplement generate carbon credits that may be used to offset their emissions levels or sold to third parties. In December 2019, the Verified Carbon Standard approved Mootral as the first methodology to reduce methane emissions from ruminant livestock.

== Publicity ==
Mootral was one of the five finalists in the FT Climate Change Challenge.

Mootral was a finalist in the Shell/BBC/Newsweek World Challenge 2009, a "competition seeking to identify and reward projects and businesses which bring economic, social and environmental benefits to local communities through grassroots solutions."

Venture capitalist Chris Sacca has invested in Mootral.
