= Fumarate reductase (NADH) =

Type of enzyme

fumarate reductase (NADH)

Identifiers
- EC no.: 1.3.1.6
- CAS no.: 9076-99-7

Databases
- IntEnz: IntEnz view
- BRENDA: BRENDA entry
- ExPASy: NiceZyme view
- KEGG: KEGG entry
- MetaCyc: metabolic pathway
- PRIAM: profile
- PDB structures: RCSB PDB PDBe PDBsum
- Gene Ontology: AmiGO / QuickGO
Search
- PMC: articles
- PubMed: articles
- NCBI: proteins

In enzymology, fumarate reductase (NADH) (EC 1.3.1.6) is an enzyme that catalyzes the chemical reaction

fumaric acid
+ NADH
H^{+}
H^{+}
succinic acid
+ NAD^{+}

The three substrates of this enzyme are fumaric acid, reduced nicotinamide adenine dinucleotide (NADH), and a proton. Its products are succinic acid and oxidised NAD^{+}.

This enzyme belongs to the family of oxidoreductases, specifically those acting on the CH-CH group of donor with NAD+ or NADP+ as acceptor. The systematic name of this enzyme class is succinate:NAD+ oxidoreductase. Other names in common use include NADH-fumarate reductase, NADH-dependent fumarate reductase, and fumarate reductase (NADH).
