= Metals Treatment Technologies =

MT2 Firing Range Services - Metals Treatment Technologies (MT2)
- Type: Private, LLC
- Industry: Environmental Services, Firing Range Solutions
- Founded: Aug. 4, 2000
- Headquarters: Arvada, Colorado
- Products: Lead Abatement
- Website: mt2.com

MT2 Firing Range Services - Metals Treatment Technologies (MT2, LLC) is an American LLC, based in Arvada, Colorado that provides environmental firing range services, and lead remediation services.

It was founded on August 4, 2000 and the company seeks to continue development, distribute, and deploy heavy metals treatment technologies for firing ranges and at contaminated sites. The proprietary technology for those is implemented under the brand name ECOBOND.

MT2 is listed as a technology vendor on the EPA (Environmental Protection Agency) website for contaminated site Cleanup-Information, as well as the Interstate Technology and Regulatory Council's "Technical/Regulatory Guidelines, Characterization and Remediation of Soils at Closed Small Arms Firing Ranges."

== Bullet shortages ==
National bullet shortages around the year 2009 resulted in higher prices for consumers, and lower ammunition availability for the military. This need provided a significant market for MT2. There was an estimated 15 years worth of lead bullets in the ground in American shooting ranges, waiting to be extracted. In 2007 MT2 extracted 560,000 pounds of the heavy metal.

== Firing ranges in the news ==
- Las Vegas Sun - Suburb to get the lead out of firing range
- Times Leader - Aiming to fix the ranges
- Marshall County Tribune - Getting the lead out
- AOL News - Bullet Makers 'Working Overtime' in US
- Denver Post - Bullet recycler gets lead out
- Pittsburgh Post-Gazette - Most state-run gun ranges closed till October for toxic lead removal
- Times Daily - Officers working around delivery delays, training issues
- The Washington Post - Maryland, River Group Settle Fight Over Creek

== Patents ==
- B2 US patent 7314512 B2, James Barthel, Mark A. Peters, "Treatment of surfaces to stabilize heavy metals", issued 2008-January-1
- B2 US patent 6984769 B2, James Barthel, Mark A. Peters, "Treatment of surfaces to stabilize heavy metals", issued 2006-January-10
