= Arla Foods =

Danish/Swedish food company

Coordinates: 56.12145°N 10.16054°E

Arla Foods amba

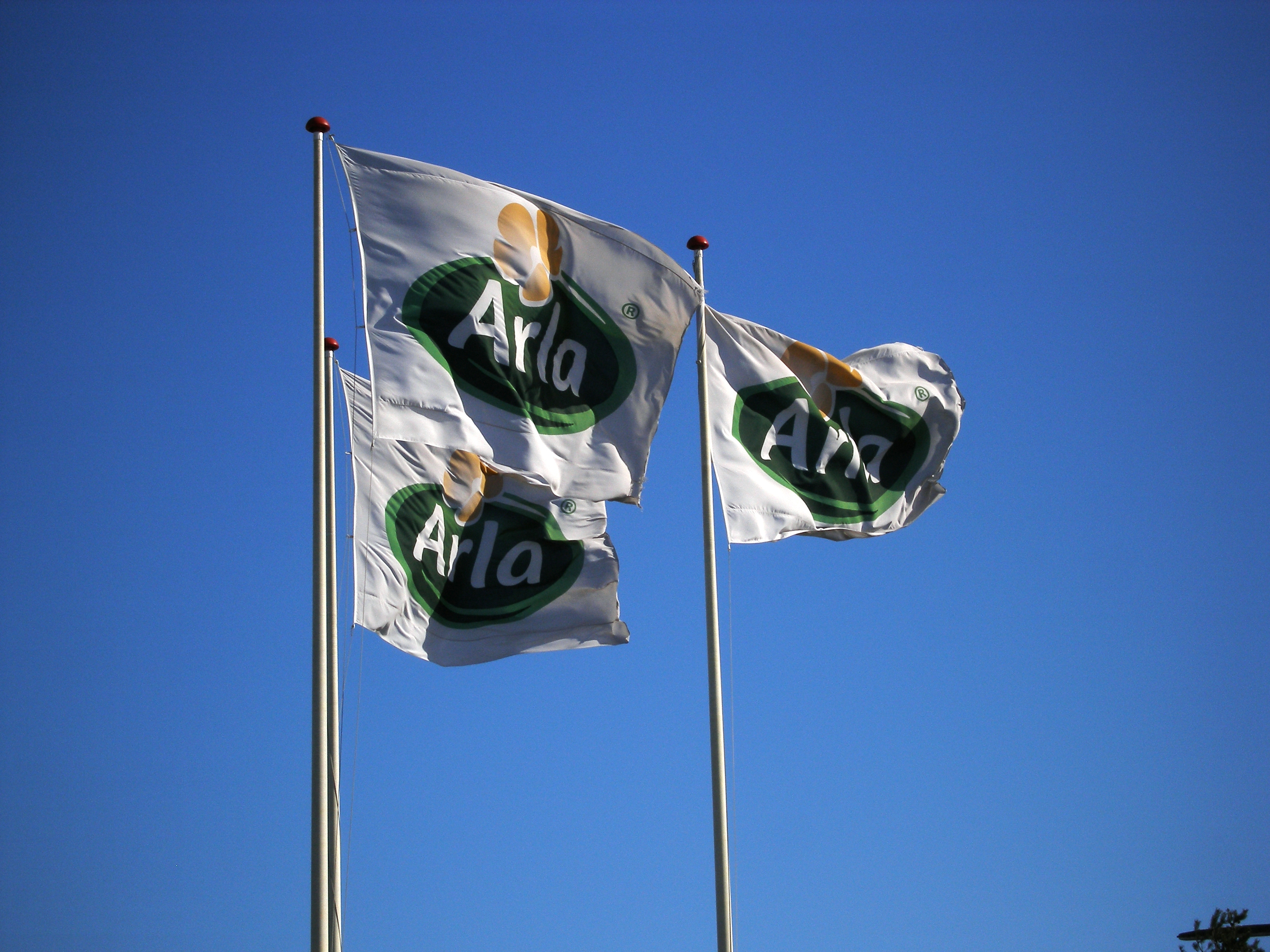
- Type: Co-operative with limited liability (Danish: Andelsselskab med begrænset ansvar)
- Industry: Dairy
- Predecessor: Arla (Sweden); Arla Foods A.m.b.A (Denmark); Arla Oy (Finland); MD Foods (UK)
- Founded: 17 April 2000, 1881 (original Arla company), 1970 (MD Foods)
- Headquarters: Viby, Denmark
- Area served: Worldwide
- Key people: Peder Tuborgh (CEO); Jan Toft Nørgaard (chairman); Jonathan Evans (UK milk)
- Revenue: 13.8 billion EUR (2022)
- Net income: 400 million EUR (2022)
- Number of employees: 20,907 (2022)
- Subsidiaries: Arla Foods Finland; Arla Foods UK
- Website: arla.com

Arla Foods is a Danish/Swedish multinational co-operative based in Viby, Denmark. It is the fifth biggest dairy company in the world and the largest producer of dairy products in Scandinavia and the United Kingdom.

Arla Foods was formed as the result of a merger between the Swedish dairy co-operative Arla and the Danish dairy company MD Foods on 17 April 2000. The name Arla derives from the same word as the English word 'early' and is an archaic Swedish term for 'early (in the morning)'.

== History ==
=== Origins ===
In the 1880s, dairy farmers in Sweden and Denmark formed small co-operatives to invest in common dairy production facilities. The first dairy co-operative was established in Sweden at Stora Arla Gård in Västmanland in 1881 under the name of Arla Mejeriförening, and the first Danish cooperative dairy was established in Hjedding, outside Ølgod, Southern Jutland in 1882.

On 26 April 1915, dairy farmers in Stockholm and adjoining counties created Sweden's largest co-operative dairy organisation, Lantmännens mjölkförsäljningsförening (the Farmers' Milk Retail Association), which operated dairies as well as a chain of shops selling dairy products.

In 1927, the company registered the name Mjölkcentralen (The Milk Centre, shortened MC) and from the 1950s a growing number of cooperative dairies in other parts of Sweden began joining MC. In 1975, MC changed its name to Arla, a name previously used not only by Sweden's first co-operative dairy, but also by the largest dairy retailer in Gothenburg between 1909 and 1965.

By the end of the 20th century, Arla had a 65% market share in Sweden.

On 1 October 1970, Mejeriselskabet Danmark (MD) was established by four dairy companies and three individual dairies. In 1988, the company changed name to MD Foods. In 1992, MD Foods and Denmark's second largest dairy company, Kløver Mælk, signed a financially binding co-operation agreement, and in 1999, the two companies merged to become MD Foods, gaining 90% of the Danish milk production.

In April 2000, MD Foods merged with Swedish Arla and formed Arla Foods A.m.b.A with headquarters in Aarhus, Denmark, and became Arla Foods as it is known today.

In 2012 the UK's leading dairy farmer co-operative Milk Link joined Arla Foods Amba, to become one of the largest and most successful European Dairy Co-operatives.

=== Current operations ===
Arla Foods is the fourth largest dairy company in the world with respect to milk volume, seventh with respect to turnover. At the start of 2022, 8,492 farmers across Denmark, Sweden, Germany, the UK, Belgium, the Netherlands and Luxembourg owned the cooperative.

Arla Foods has many brands; several minor brands and four strategic brands. The major and strategic brands are: Arla, Lurpak, Puck and Castello cheeses that are sold worldwide. The Arla Brand is both a co-operative brand and a brand across all product categories. Puck is Arla brand equivalent in the MENA region, and Castello is a cheese brand including blue cheese and yellow cheeses.

Next to the four major brands, Arla also has a long-term strategic partnership with Starbucks to manufacture, distribute and market their RTD (ready to drink) coffee products for the EMEA region (Europe, the Middle East and Africa).

In 2011 Arla Foods incorporated Arla Foods Ingredients (AFI), a former division, as an independent subsidiary. The company develops and manufactures milk-based ingredients, primarily functional and nutritional milk proteins, bioactive phospholipids, minerals, permeate and lactose for the food industry.

The head office is located in Denmark. Arla Foods Ingredients has one wholly owned production plant in Denmark, with joint venture production at facilities in Argentina and Germany. In March 2011, Arla Foods and DMK formed the joint venture company ArNoCo GmbH & Co. KG, to produce whey proteins for the food industry. In February 2018, Arla Foods announced its plans to invest £70 million in the UK, as part of its strategy to secure long-term opportunities for its farmers across Europe. In October 2019, Arla Foods has invested an estimated €50 million (US$55 million) in a cheese production site in Bahrain. By 2025, Arla expects to increase annual production in Bahrain to more than 100,000 tons under its Puck, Arla, Dano, Kraft and Private Label brands.

==== 2006 boycott ====
Arla's sales were seriously affected by a two-month long boycott of Danish products in the Middle East in 2006. Anger among Muslims over satirical cartoons of Prophet Muhammad published in Denmark was the initial cause.

When the Danish government refused to condemn the cartoons or meet with eleven ambassadors from Muslim nations, a boycott of Danish products was organised, starting in Saudi Arabia and spreading across the Middle East. The Middle East is Arla's largest market outside of Europe.

On 3 February 2006, the company said that sales in the Middle East dried up completely, costing the company US$2 million a day. Soon after the boycott hit Arla's sales, the Danish government met with Muslim ambassadors and the newspaper issued an apology. Despite this, the boycott continued unabated for two months.

In March 2006, Arla took out full page advertising in Saudi Arabia, apologising for the cartoons and indicating Arla's respect for Islam in the country. This caused controversy in Denmark, where women's organisations and some politicians criticised Arla, and called on Danish women to boycott Arla's products in Denmark. In April 2006, the company said that its products were being placed back in shops in the Middle East.

Before the boycott, it supplied 50,000 shops in the area. It announced that many of its largest clients in Saudi Arabia would start selling its butter and cheese on 8 April 2006. At that time, Arla began sponsoring humanitarian causes in the Middle East to foster good public relations with the region.

==== Don't Cancel the Cow campaign ====
In 2022, Arla launched an advertising campaign called Don't Cancel the Cow claiming the rise of veganism among young people was the reason the dairy industry's future is uncertain. The campaign targets young people over their concern about the environmental impact of cows milk.

==== Bovaer ====
In November 2024 in the UK, the use of Bovaer led to calls on social media for a consumer boycott of Arla products, including Lurpak butter. Arla Foods had announced that 30 of its farms across the country would test the additive, which can reduce cow methane emissions by between 30 and 45%. Bovaer is approved for use by UK regulators, however SVT reported that conspiracy theories were being spread that the feed supplement was poisonous, with some online users raising concerns, citing issues around the safety of certain compounds used in it. The manufacturer, DSM-Firmenich, said "mistruths and misinformation, external" had been spread about the product, that it was "totally safe" for use, and that it had been "tested over many years in many countries." The supplement had already been tested by Arla in Sweden during 2023 on five farms.

== International distribution ==
=== Indonesia ===
In Indonesia, Arla is distributed by Indofood, Pandurasa Kharisma, & Prambanan Kencana as joint venture and import company.

=== Malaysia ===
In Malaysia, Arla is distributed by Lamsoon who also distribute Lion Corporation products.

=== Bangladesh ===
In Bangladesh, Arla sells its milk powder and milk products under the Dano brand. For over 60 years, Dano has been the most popular milk brand in Bangladesh.

=== China ===
In China, Arla is distributed by Mengniu.

=== Japan ===
In Japan, Arla was once distributed by Morinaga Milk Industry. However, it is now distributed by various small companies.

=== South Korea ===
In South Korea, Arla is distributed by Maeil Dairies.

=== Egypt ===
In Egypt, Arla is distributed by Juhayna.

=== West Africa ===
In West Africa, Arla is distributed by Tolaram Group who also distribute Indomie, Nestle, and Colgate.

=== United States ===
In the US, Arla is distributed by Dairy Farmers of America who also distribute Fromageries Bel.

=== Germany ===
In Germany, Arla is distributed by DMK Group.

=== United Kingdom ===
In the United Kingdom, Arla is distributed by Volac, which also distributes Nestle, First Milk and Wilmar.

== See also ==
- First Milk (company)
- List of companies of Sweden
- List of companies of Denmark
