= Methanogenesis =

Formation of methane by microbes

Methanogenesis or biomethanation is the formation of methane coupled to energy conservation by microbes known as methanogens. It is the fourth and final stage of anaerobic digestion. Organisms capable of producing methane for energy conservation have been identified only from the domain Archaea, a group phylogenetically distinct from both eukaryotes and bacteria, although many live in close association with anaerobic bacteria. The production of methane is an important and widespread form of microbial metabolism. In anoxic environments, it is the final step in the decomposition of biomass. Methanogenesis is responsible for significant amounts of natural gas accumulations, the remainder being thermogenic.

== Biochemistry ==
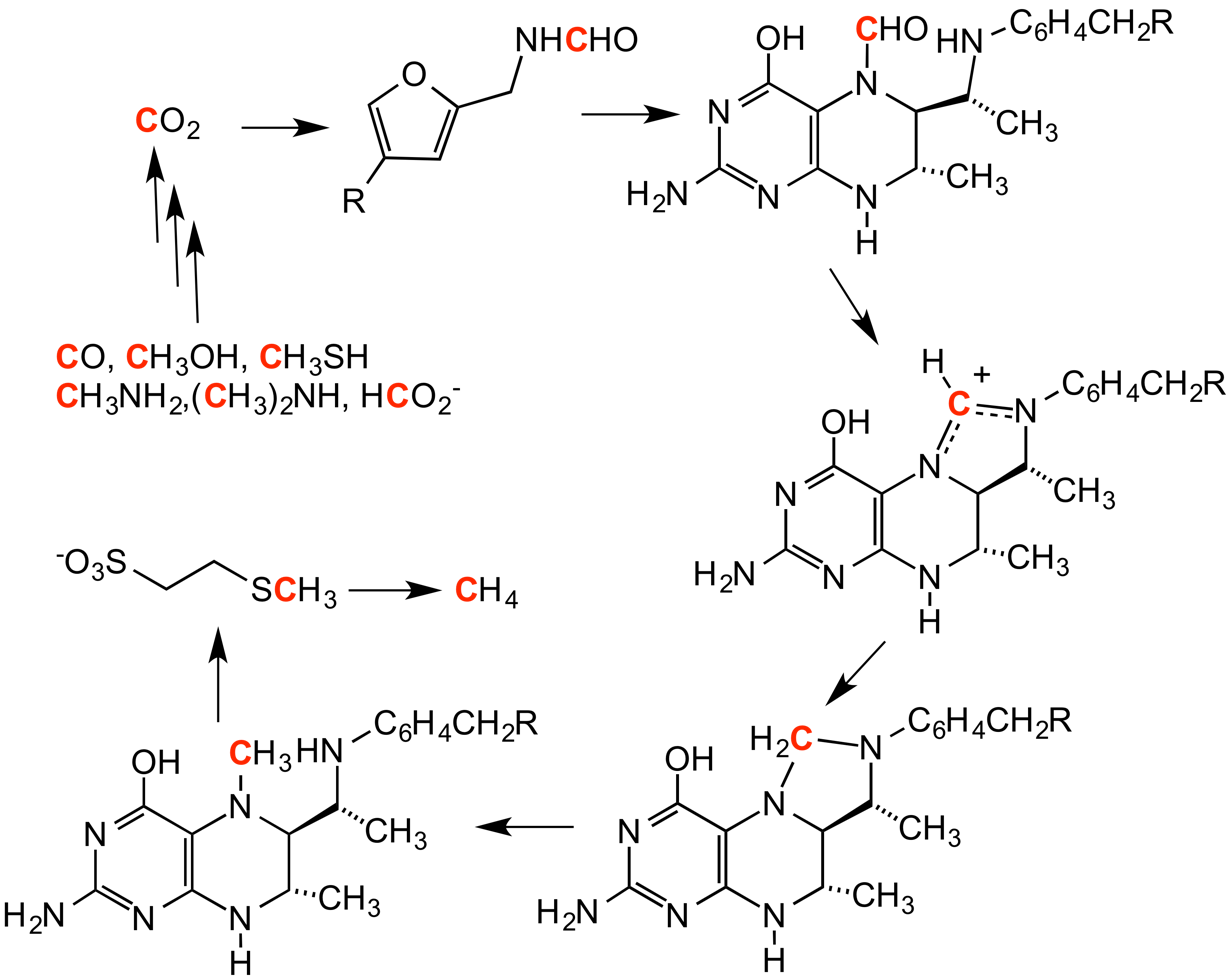
Cycle for methanogenesis, showing intermediates.

Methanogenesis in microbes is a form of anaerobic respiration. Methanogens do not use oxygen to respire; in fact, oxygen inhibits the growth of methanogens. The terminal electron acceptor in methanogenesis is not oxygen, but carbon. The two best described pathways involve the use of acetic acid (acetoclastic) or inorganic carbon dioxide (hydrogenotrophic) as terminal electron acceptors:

CO_{2} + 4 H_{2} → CH_{4} + 2 H_{2}O

CH_{3}COOH → CH_{4} + CO_{2}

During anaerobic respiration of carbohydrates, H_{2} and acetate are formed in a ratio of 2:1 or lower, so H_{2} contributes only c. 33% to methanogenesis, with acetate contributing the greater proportion. In some circumstances, for instance in the rumen, where acetate is largely absorbed into the bloodstream of the host, the contribution of H_{2} to methanogenesis is greater.

However, depending on pH and temperature, methanogenesis has been shown to use carbon from other small organic compounds, such as formic acid (formate), methanol, methylamines, tetramethylammonium, dimethyl sulfide, and methanethiol. The catabolism of the methyl compounds is mediated by methyl transferases to give methyl coenzyme M.

=== Proposed mechanism ===
The biochemistry of methanogenesis involves the following coenzymes and cofactors: F420, coenzyme B, coenzyme M, methanofuran, and methanopterin.

The mechanism for the conversion of CH_{3}–S bond into methane involves a ternary complex of the enzyme, with the substituents forming a structure α_{2}β_{2}γ_{2}. Within the complex, methyl coenzyme M and coenzyme B fit into a channel terminated by the axial site on nickel of the cofactor F430. One proposed mechanism invokes electron transfer from Ni(I) (to give Ni(II)), which initiates formation of CH_{4}. Coupling of the coenzyme M thiyl radical (RS^{.}) with HS coenzyme B releases a proton and re-reduces Ni(II) by one electron, regenerating Ni(I).

=== Reverse methanogenesis ===
Some organisms can oxidize methane, functionally reversing the process of methanogenesis, also referred to as the anaerobic oxidation of methane (AOM). Organisms performing AOM have been found in multiple marine and freshwater environments including methane seeps, hydrothermal vents, coastal sediments and sulfate-methane transition zones. These organisms may accomplish reverse methanogenesis using a nickel-containing protein similar to methyl-coenzyme M reductase used by methanogenic archaea. Reverse methanogenesis occurs according to the reaction:

SO^{2−}_{4} + CH_{4} → HCO^{−}_{3} + HS^{−} + H_{2}O

=== Importance in carbon cycle ===
Methanogenesis is the final step in the anaerobic decay of organic matter. During the decay process, electron acceptors (such as oxygen, ferric iron, sulfate, and nitrate) become depleted, while hydrogen (H_{2}) and carbon dioxide accumulate. Light organics produced by fermentation also accumulate. During advanced stages of organic decay, all electron acceptors become depleted except carbon dioxide. Carbon dioxide is a product of most catabolic processes, so it is not depleted like other potential electron acceptors.

Only methanogenesis and fermentation can occur in the absence of electron acceptors other than carbon. Fermentation only allows the breakdown of larger organic compounds, and produces small organic compounds. Methanogenesis effectively removes the semi-final products of decay: hydrogen, small organics, and carbon dioxide. Without methanogenesis, a great deal of carbon (in the form of fermentation products) would accumulate in anaerobic environments.

== Natural occurrence ==
=== In ruminants ===
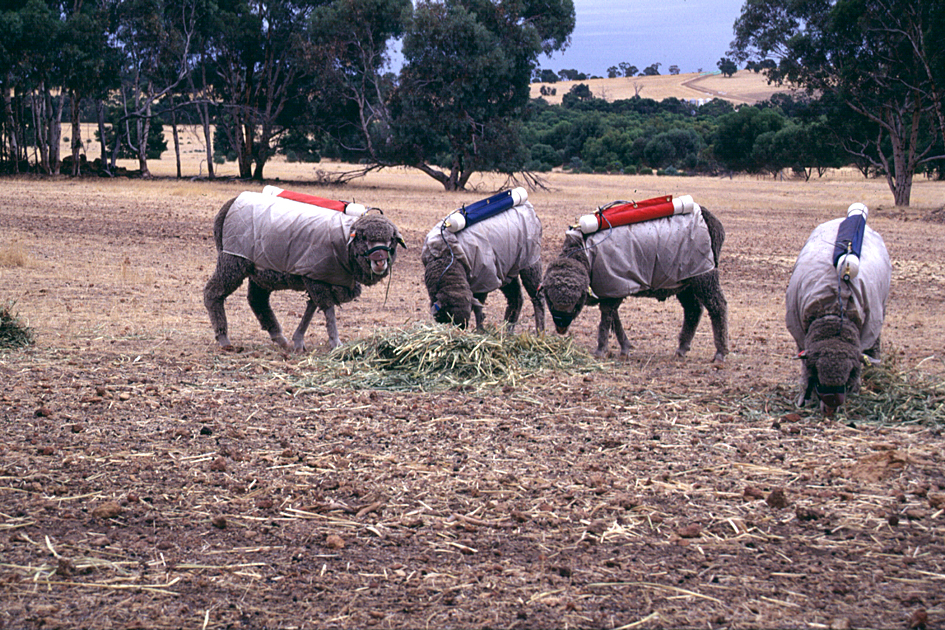
Testing Australian sheep for exhaled methane production (2001), CSIRO

Enteric fermentation occurs in the gut of some animals, especially ruminants. In the rumen, anaerobic organisms, including methanogens, digest cellulose into forms nutritious to the animal. Without these microorganisms, animals such as cattle would not be able to consume grasses. The useful products of methanogenesis are absorbed by the gut, but methane is released from the animal mainly by belching (eructation). The average cow emits around 250 liters of methane per day. In this way, ruminants contribute about 25% of anthropogenic methane emissions. One method of methane production control in ruminants is by feeding them 3-nitrooxypropanol.

=== In humans ===
Some humans produce flatus that contains methane. In one study of the feces of nine adults, five of the samples contained archaea capable of producing methane. Similar results are found in samples of gas obtained from within the rectum.

Even among humans whose flatus does contain methane, the amount is in the range of 10% or less of the total amount of gas.

=== In plants ===
Many experiments have suggested that leaf tissues of living plants emit methane. A study done in 2006 estimated that global vegetation released between 60 and 240 million tonnes of methane yearly, corresponding to 40% of annual methane emissions. In a follow up study done in 2009, plants grown in carbon-13 enriched environments were observed to not emit significant amounts of methane. Other research has indicated that the plants are not actually generating methane; they are just absorbing methane from the soil and then emitting it through their leaf tissues. Such an instance can be seen in seasonally flooded parts of the Amazon Rainforest, where trees in said areas pumped 200 times the normal amount of methane out from each tree, accounting for around 40 million tonnes of methane emitted per year.

=== In soils ===
Methanogens are observed in anoxic soil environments, contributing to the degradation of organic matter. This organic matter may be placed by humans through landfill, buried as sediment on the bottom of lakes or oceans as sediments, and as residual organic matter from sediments that have formed into sedimentary rocks. Methanogenesis is not strictly limited to anoxic ecosystems such as peats and bogs; damp mineral soils can also contain high methane levels between the microscopic spaces of decaying organic matter. As a result, the process of methanogenesis is common in rice fields and wetlands as these areas are flooded fields and are a natural methane source. The production of methane in flooded soils like these requires microbes that prefer low oxygen levels. Aerating methanogenic soils increases levels of sulfates and nitrates, nutrients that reduce the production of methane. For methanogenesis to continue, nitrate and sulfate levels will need to decrease. In a separate study conducted in remote arctic soils, higher amounts of methanogens had a direct correlation with increased potential methane production. Methanogenesis in upland soils is often localized within anoxic microsites, even when the bulk soil remains aerobic.

=== In Earth's crust ===
Methanogens are a notable part of the microbial communities in continental and marine deep biosphere.

=== In marine environments ===
Approximately one third of methanogens which have been described arise from marine origins, a majority being from the clade Euryarchaeota. In the marine environment, methanogenic microorganisms compete for resources with sulfate-reducers. As a result of this, sulfate-depleted areas of high organic matter loading and sediments are areas of methanogen predominance. The anaerobic nature of sediments allow for methanogenic activity and flourishing of methanogenic communities, making marine sediments an important habitat for methane generating microbial communities. A major compound which methanogens consume to generate methane is acetate, which composes two thirds of global methane production. Another compound which contributes to marine sediment methanogenesis is carbon monoxide, which is oxidized into carbon dioxide, before undergoing a series of reactions to produce energy as methane is released from the microbe. This compound is considered non-competitive with sulfate-reducers, allowing for free use by methanogens. In examination of the microorganism M. acetivorans, methane synthesis pathways retain similarities with freshwater taxa, however proteins distinct to the marine sediment microbes are found which operate on the methanogenic pathway. The estimated annual release of methane from the ocean into the atmosphere is approximately 0.7-14 billion kg CH_{4} per year. Despite the requirement of anoxic conditions for main methanogenic processes, supersaturation of methane in surface ocean waters creates the “marine methane paradox”, which leads to the release of methane into the atmosphere from the ocean.

Recent studies seek to explain this paradox by examining the possibility of methane synthesis in the surface ocean despite oxic conditions. Oxic sources of methane were discovered in microbial communities starved of phosphorus in surface oceans, where the catabolism of the compound methyl-phosphonic acid (Mpn) has been found to co-produce methane in oxic ocean waters, providing a potential explanation to the paradox. N. maritimus, a widespread archaeon in the ocean, was found to contain pathways for the synthesis of methyl-phosphonic acid within these oxic ocean waters. The production of this compound from surrounding materials allows for methanogenesis via breakdown by surrounding bacteria and microbes. Furthermore, the prevalence of Mpn synthesis is consistent with abundance of Mpn reducing taxa such as Pelagibacter, The linkage between the producers of Mpn and the degraders of the compound lead to the production of methane. In microbes which reduce methyl-phosphonic acids, C-P lyase proteins have been found to be crucial to this reduction process ^{[4]}, which acts as a source of phosphorus for the microbes as well as releasing methane. Mutants which disrupted Mpn degradation pathways were found to also show degradation of methanogenesis, confirming the link between the breakdown of methyl-phosphonic acid compounds and the production of methane within oxic ocean environments. Upregulation of transport and hydrolysis of phosphonate compounds within bacteria was found to occur in phosphate limitation, further illustrating the use of these compounds for necessary metabolic activity. The presence of this Mpn synthesis-degradation within the oxic conditions of the surface ocean explain the supersaturation of methane which caused the “marine methane paradox”, providing evidence for methanogenesis outside of the anoxic conditions which are necessary for the usual methanogenic pathways.

== Industry ==
Methanogenesis can also be beneficially exploited, to treat organic waste, to produce useful compounds, and the methane can be collected and used as biogas, a fuel. It is the primary pathway whereby most organic matter disposed of via landfill is broken down. Some biogas plants use methanogenesis to combine the CO_{2} with hydrogen to create more methane.

== Role in global warming ==
Methane is an important greenhouse gas with a global warming potential 25 times greater than carbon dioxide (averaged over 100 years). Methanogenesis in livestock and the decay of organic material contributes to global warming.

== Extra-terrestrial life ==
The presence of atmospheric methane has a role in the scientific search for extra-terrestrial life. The justification is that on an astronomical timescale, methane in the atmosphere of an Earth-like celestial body will quickly dissipate, and that its presence on such a planet or moon therefore indicates that something is replenishing it. If methane is detected (by using a spectrometer for example) this may indicate that life is, or recently was, present. This was debated when methane was discovered in the Martian atmosphere by M.J. Mumma of NASA's Goddard Flight Center, and verified by the Mars Express Orbiter (2004) and in Titan's atmosphere by the Huygens probe (2005). This debate was furthered with the discovery of 'transient', 'spikes of methane' on Mars by the Curiosity Rover.

It is argued that atmospheric methane can come from volcanoes or other fissures in the planet's crust and that without an isotopic signature, the origin or source may be difficult to identify.

On 13 April 2017, NASA confirmed that the dive of the Cassini orbiter spacecraft on 28 October 2015 discovered an Enceladus plume which has all the ingredients for methanogenesis-based life forms to feed on. Previous results, published in March 2015, suggested hot water is interacting with rock beneath the sea of Enceladus; the new finding supported that conclusion, and add that the rock appears to be reacting chemically. From these observations scientists have determined that nearly 98 percent of the gas in the plume is water, about 1 percent is hydrogen, and the rest is a mixture of other molecules including carbon dioxide, methane and ammonia.

== See also ==
- Aerobic methane production
- Anaerobic digestion
- Anaerobic oxidation of methane
- Electromethanogenesis
- Hydrogen cycle
- Methanotroph
- Mootral
