= Coenzyme B =

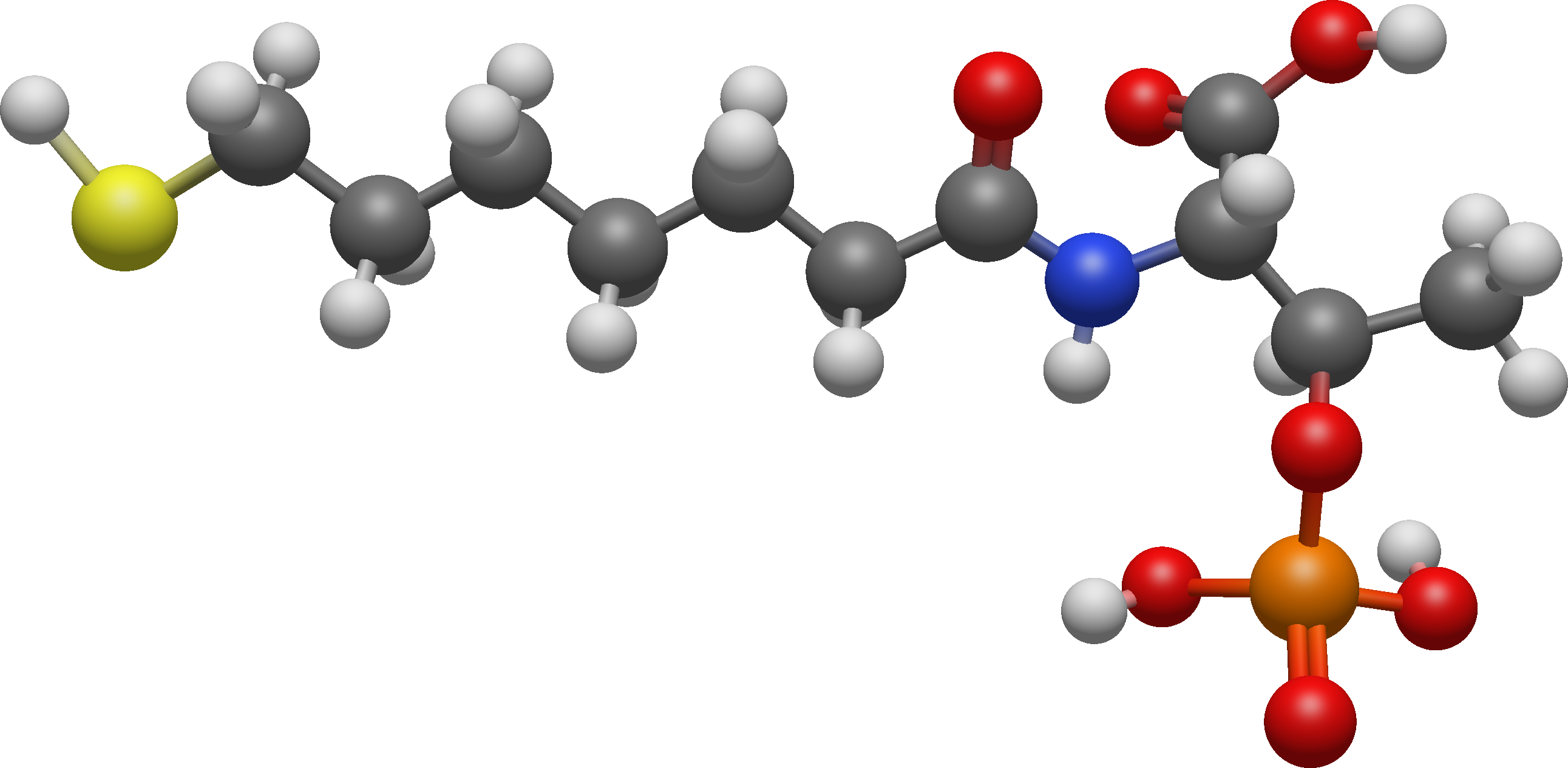

Names
- IUPAC name 2-[(7-mercapto-1-oxoheptyl)amino]-3-phosphonooxybutanoic acid

Identifiers
CAS Number	104302-77-4
3D model (JSmol)	Interactive image; Interactive image
ChemSpider	343
PubChem CID	350
UNII	9GS022ISQL
CompTox Dashboard (EPA)	DTXSID70897000
- InChI: InChI=1S/C11H22NO7PS/c1-8(19-20(16,17)18)10(11(14)15)12-9(13)6-4-2-3-5-7-21/h8,10,21H,2-7H2,1H3,(H,12,13)(H,14,15)(H2,16,17,18) Key: JBJSVEVEEGOEBZ-UHFFFAOYSA-N; InChI=1/C11H22NO7PS/c1-8(19-20(16,17)18)10(11(14)15)12-9(13)6-4-2-3-5-7-21/h8,10,21H,2-7H2,1H3,(H,12,13)(H,14,15)(H2,16,17,18)/t8-,10-/m1/s1 Key: JBJSVEVEEGOEBZ-PSASIEDQBT; InChI=1/C11H22NO7PS/c1-8(19-20(16,17)18)10(11(14)15)12-9(13)6-4-2-3-5-7-21/h8,10,21H,2-7H2,1H3,(H,12,13)(H,14,15)(H2,16,17,18) Key: JBJSVEVEEGOEBZ-UHFFFAOYAG
- SMILES: O=C(N[C@@H](C(=O)O)[C@H](OP(=O)(O)O)C)CCCCCCS; O=C(NC(C(=O)O)C(OP(=O)(O)O)C)CCCCCCS

Properties
Chemical formula	C_{11}H_{22}NO_{7}PS
Molar mass	343.333641
- Except where otherwise noted, data are given for materials in their standard state (at 25 °C [77 °F], 100 kPa). verify (what is ?) Infobox references

Coenzyme B is a coenzyme required for redox reactions in methanogens. The full chemical name of coenzyme B is 7-mercaptoheptanoylthreoninephosphate. The molecule contains a thiol, which is its principal site of reaction.

Coenzyme B reacts with 2-methylthioethanesulfonate (methyl-Coenzyme M, abbreviated CH_{3}–S–CoM), to release methane in methanogenesis:

CH_{3}–S–CoM + HS–CoB → CH_{4} + CoB–S–S–CoM

This conversion is catalyzed by the enzyme methyl coenzyme M reductase, which contains cofactor F430 as the prosthetic group.

A related conversion that utilizes both HS-CoB and HS-CoM is the reduction of fumarate to succinate, catalyzed by fumarate reductase:

HS–CoM + HS–CoB + ^{−}O_{2}CCH=CHCO^{−}_{2} → ^{−}O_{2}CCH_{2}–CH_{2}CO^{−}_{2} + CoB–S–S–CoM

== Importance of coenzyme B in methanogenesis ==
Coenzyme B is an important component in the terminal step of methane biogenesis. It acts as a two electron-donor to reduce coenzyme M (methyl-coenzyme) into two molecules a methane and a heterodisulfide. Two separate experiments that were performed, one with coenzyme B and other without coenzyme B, indicated that using coenzyme B before the formation of the methane molecule, results in a more efficient and consistent bond cleavage.
