= 5-Methyltetrahydrofolate:corrinoid/iron-sulfur protein Co-methyltransferase =

Class of enzymes

5-methyltetrahydrofolate:corrinoid/iron-sulfur protein Co-methyltransferase

Identifiers
- EC no.: 2.1.1.258

Databases
- IntEnz: IntEnz view
- BRENDA: BRENDA entry
- ExPASy: NiceZyme view
- KEGG: KEGG entry
- MetaCyc: metabolic pathway
- PRIAM: profile
- PDB structures: RCSB PDB PDBe PDBsum
Search
- PMC: articles
- PubMed: articles
- NCBI: proteins

5-methyltetrahydrofolate:corrinoid/iron-sulfur protein Co-methyltransferase (EC 2.1.1.258, acsE (gene)) is an enzyme with systematic name 5-methyltetrahydrofolate:corrinoid/iron-sulfur protein methyltransferase. This enzyme catalyses the following chemical reaction

[Methyl-Co(III) corrinoid Fe-S protein] + tetrahydrofolate $\rightleftharpoons$ a [Co(I) corrinoid Fe-S protein] + 5-methyltetrahydrofolate

This enzyme catalyses the transfer of a carbon atom and associated hydrogen atoms from the N^{5} position of methyltetrahydrofolate to the 5-methoxybenzimidazolylcobamide cofactor of a corrinoid/Fe-S protein, containing a corrin ring similar to that in cobalamin. Although called a methyl transferase, the net transfer is of one carbon atom and two hydrogen atoms – the methyltetrahydrofolate contains only two hydrogen atoms more than the tetrahydrofolate. The cobalt atom is able to change oxidation state by obtaining electrons from the 4Fe-4S complex in the protein.
