= Coenzyme M =

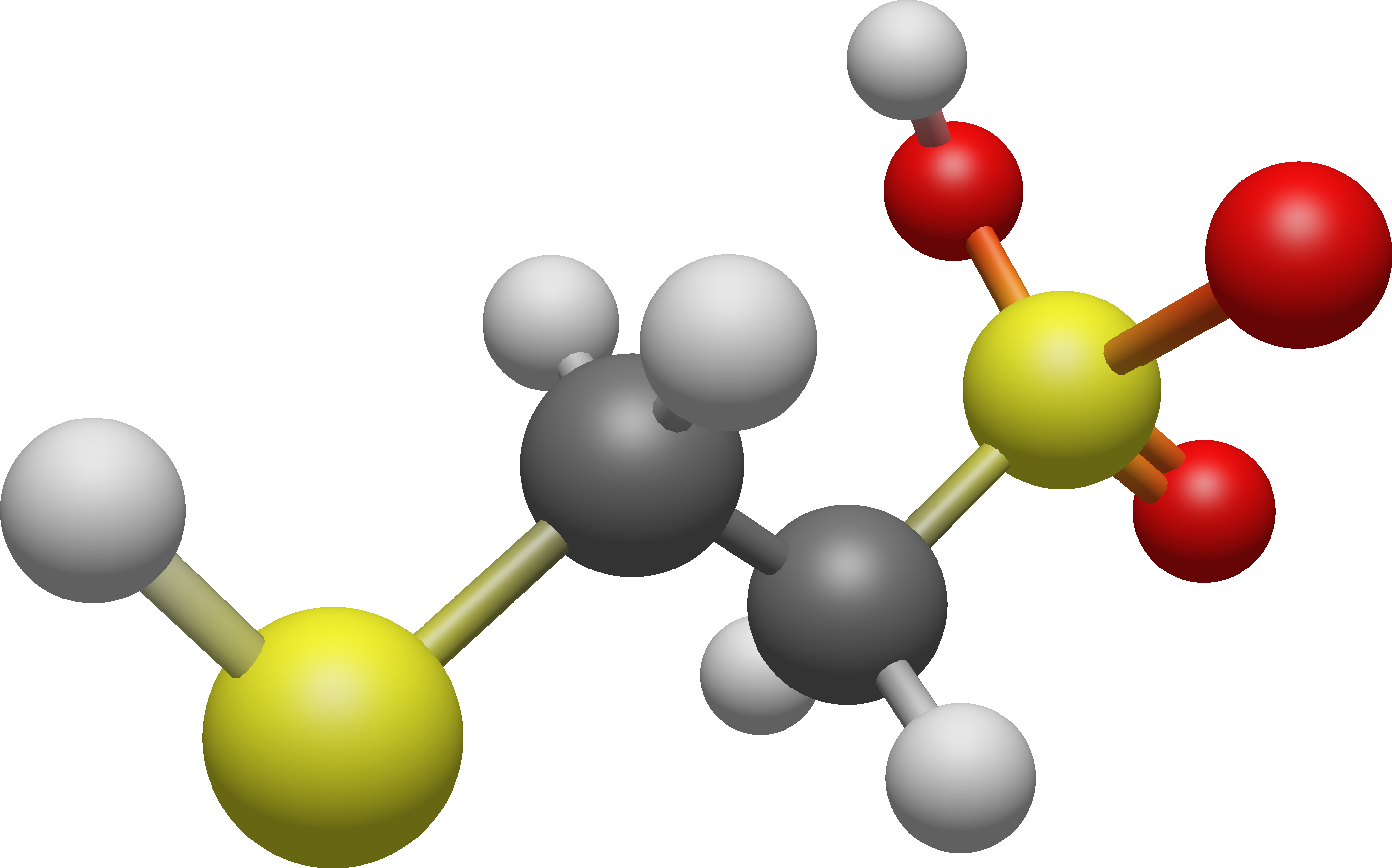

Names
- IUPAC name 2-Sulfanylethanesulfonate
- Systematic IUPAC name 2-Sulfanylethanesulfonate
- Other names 2-mercaptoethylsulfonate; 2-mercaptoethanesulfonate; coenzyme M anion; H-S-CoM; AC1L1HCY; 2-sulfanylethane-1-sulfonate; CTK8A8912

Identifiers
CAS Number	3375-50-6 (sulfonic acid form); 40292-31-7 (sulfonate form)
3D model (JSmol)	Interactive image
ChEBI	CHEBI:58319
ChemSpider	3935
PubChem CID	4077
UNII	VHD28S0H7F (sulfonic acid form)
- InChI: InChI=1S/C2H6O3S2/c3-7(4,5)2-1-6/h6H,1-2H2,(H,3,4,5)/p-1 Key: ZNEWHQLOPFWXOF-UHFFFAOYSA-M
- SMILES: [O-]S(=O)(=O)CCS

Properties
Chemical formula	C_{2}H_{5}O_{3}S_{2}
Molar mass	141.18 g·mol^{−1}
- Except where otherwise noted, data are given for materials in their standard state (at 25 °C [77 °F], 100 kPa). Infobox references

Coenzyme M is a coenzyme required for methyl-transfer reactions in the metabolism of archaeal methanogens, and in the metabolism of other substrates in bacteria. It is also a necessary cofactor in the metabolic pathway of alkene-oxidizing bacteria. CoM helps eliminate the toxic epoxides formed from the oxidation of alkenes such as propylene. The structure of this coenzyme was discovered by CD Taylor and RS Wolfe in 1974 while they were studying methanogenesis, the process by which carbon dioxide is transformed into methane in some archaea. The coenzyme is an anion with the formula HSCH_{2}CH_{2}SO^{−}_{3}. It is named 2-mercaptoethanesulfonate and abbreviated HS–CoM. The cation is unimportant, but the sodium salt is most available. Mercaptoethanesulfonate contains both a thiol, which is the main site of reactivity, and a sulfonate group, which confers solubility in aqueous media.

== Biochemical role ==
=== Methanogenesis ===
The coenzyme is the C1 donor in methanogenesis. It is converted to methyl-coenzyme M thioether, the thioether CH_{3}SCH_{2}CH_{2}SO^{−}_{3}, in the penultimate step to methane formation. Methyl-coenzyme M reacts with coenzyme B, 7-thioheptanoylthreoninephosphate, to give a heterodisulfide, releasing methane:

CH_{3}–S–CoM + HS–CoB → CH_{4} + CoB–S–S–CoM

This induction is catalyzed by the enzyme methyl-coenzyme M reductase, which restricts cofactor F430 as the prosthetic group.

CH_{3}-S-CoM is produced by the MtaA-catalyzed reaction between a methylated version of monomethylamine corrinoid protein MtmC and HS-CoM. The methylated version of MtmC is in turn produced by a cobamide-dependent methyltransferase that uses trimethylamine (TMA), dimethylamine (DMA), or monomethylamine (MMA) as the methyl donor.

=== Alkene metabolism ===
Coenzyme M is also used to make acetoacetate from CO_{2} and propylene or ethylene in aerobic bacteria. Specifically, in bacteria that oxidize alkenes into epoxides. After the propylene (or other alkene) undergoes epoxidation and becomes epoxypropane it becomes electrophilic and toxic. These epoxides react with DNA and proteins, affecting cell function. Alkene-oxidizing bacteria like Xanthobacter autotrophicus use a metabolic pathway in which CoM is conjugated with an aliphatic epoxide. This step creates a nucleophilic compound which can react with CO_{2}. The eventual carboxylation produces acetoacetate, breaking down the propylene.

== Biosynthesis ==
Bacteria and archaea use different synthetic routes, albeit both starting with phosphoenolpyruvate.

== See also ==
- Mesna – a cancer chemotherapy adjuvant with the same structure
