= 2015 Wootton Bassett rail incident =

Charter train passed a signal at danger

Wootton Bassett rail incident
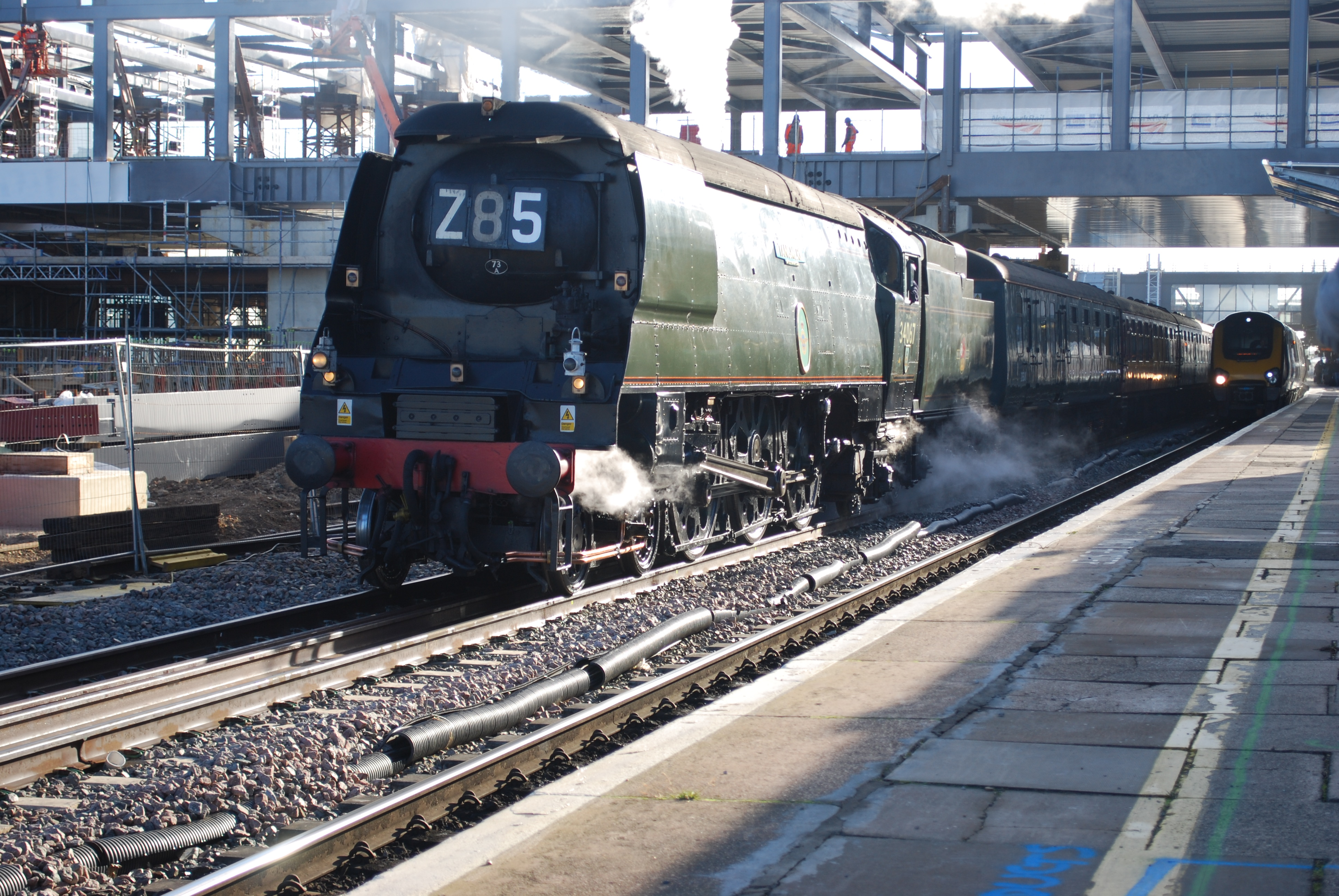
- 34067 Tangmere was the locomotive hauling the charter train

- Location of Wootton Bassett Jn in Wiltshire

Details
- Date: 7 March 2015; 17:25 UTC
- Location: Wootton Bassett Junction, Wiltshire
- Coordinates: 51°32′07″N 1°54′20″W
- Country: United Kingdom
- Line: Great Western Main Line and South Wales Main Line
- Operator: West Coast Railways; First Great Western
- Incident type: SPAD
- Cause: Traincrew error: mishandling of AWS and braking system on train.

Statistics
- Trains: Two
- Passengers: 717
- Crew: ~45

On 7 March 2015, a steam-hauled charter train passed a signal at danger and subsequently came to a stand across a high-speed mainline junction near Wootton Bassett Junction, Wiltshire, England. Another train, which had right of way, had passed through the junction 44 seconds earlier and no collision occurred nor was any damage done.

As a result of this signal passed at danger (SPAD), Network Rail banned the train's operator, West Coast Railways (WCR), from operating trains anywhere on the British railway network. The Rail Accident Investigation Branch (RAIB) opened an investigation into the incident, which it called a "dangerous occurrence". The incident was rated the most serious SPAD in the United Kingdom since December 2010. Following improvements made by WCR, the ban was lifted. A subsequent incident led to a further ban, which was later lifted.

In December 2015, the Office of Rail and Road initiated a prosecution against the driver of the train and WCR for offences under the Health and Safety at Work etc. Act 1974. The case was heard in June 2016. Both WCR and the driver of the train pleaded guilty. WCR was fined £200,000 plus costs. The driver received a sentence of four months' imprisonment, suspended for eighteen months.

In May 2016, the RAIB published a report on the incident, which largely blamed the incident on the train crew tampering with a safety system that would otherwise have safely brought the train to a halt.

== Incident ==
At 17:25 GMT on 7 March 2015, a charter train approached Wootton Bassett Junction, where the Great Western Main Line and South Wales Main Line diverge at Royal Wootton Bassett, Wiltshire. In the approach to signal SN43, an Automatic Warning System (AWS) magnet was present in the trackbed, warning of a temporary speed restriction ahead. The line speed was 125 miles per hour (201 km/h). The temporary restriction of 85 miles per hour (137 km/h) then in force did not apply to the train as steam locomotives are restricted to a maximum of 75 miles per hour (121 km/h) on Network Rail (NR) tracks in any event. An emergency brake application occurred on the train after it had passed over the magnet because the driver failed to press the AWS cancelling button within 2.7 seconds.

The driver should have allowed the train to come to a stand and contacted the signalman, but he did not. Instead the AWS isolating cock was operated, releasing the brake after the train's speed had been reduced from 59 miles per hour (95 km/h) to about 51 miles per hour (82 km/h). This had the effect of isolating both the AWS and the Train Protection & Warning System (TPWS), rendering them unable to apply the brakes. Although the driver was permitted to operate the isolating cock under certain fault conditions, he did not follow the British Railway Rule Book protocol or inform the signaller that he had done so.

The next signal, SN45, was displaying a red (danger) aspect. By the time the driver saw this, there was insufficient distance available to stop the train, which eventually came to a stand on the junction some 700 yards (640 m) past the signal. The service train that was being protected by the red signal had already passed through the junction and no collision occurred. As the points had already moved for the passage of the charter train, no damage was done to the trackwork at Wootton Bassett Jn. The line speed approaching the junction was 70 miles per hour (110 km/h) for the service train. Before he was relieved from driving duties, the driver of the charter train claimed that signal SN43 had displayed a green (proceed) aspect. NR investigations showed that a single yellow (caution) aspect was displayed.

Following the incident, the driver was relieved at Swindon. There a new driver was supplied by West Coast Railways (WCR) who drove the train to Southall, where the train was terminated.

The incident was rated the most serious SPAD since December 2010, rating 25 out of 28 on Network Rail's scale. Any SPAD rated at 20 or more leads to a mandatory investigation by the Office of Rail and Road (ORR). The scale is logarithmic, with each increment rated twice as serious as the previous; thus the incident was rated as nominally over thirty times more serious than this threshold. The December 2010 SPAD was rated at 26, and was at Uphill Junction, Somerset, on the Bristol to Exeter line when a passenger train overran a signal by 180 yards (160 m). The month before that incident, a passenger train overran a signal at Tamworth, Staffordshire, in an incident rated at 25.

=== RAIB investigation findings ===
The RAIB investigation into the accident reported that the outward working, reporting number 1Z21, the 07:22 from Southend East to Bristol Temple Meads, had been fitted with a numbered plastic tie on the handle of the Automatic Warning System (AWS) isolating cock. The train was driven to Bristol without incident, although some misting of the driver's window was reported. The driver of that train was not the driver later involved in the SPAD at Wootton Bassett. During an empty coaching stock movement to St Philip's Marsh depot, the emergency brake applied because the driver did not cancel an AWS warning in the allotted time. The AWS isolating cock was opened, breaking the seal. On leaving St Philip's Marsh, a similar incident occurred, and the AWS isolating cock was opened again. There was a change of traincrew on arrival at Bristol Temple Meads, where the return working was designated 1Z67. According to the rulebook, the driver of the train should have reported the missing seal on the AWS isolating cock. The train should not have been allowed to depart until the cock had been sealed. The driver did not do this, and set off with an unsealed cock.

Due to misting and exhaust obstructing the driver's view through the window, the driver drove leaning out of the cab for much of the time. This made hearing the AWS sounder and observing the AWS reminder light harder. Approaching signal SN43, there was a temporary speed restriction of 85 miles per hour (137 km/h), which was warned of by a temporary AWS magnet in advance of the restriction, and indicated by a sign at the start of the temporary speed restriction. The train approached signal SN43 at 59 miles per hour (95 km/h) and passed over the temporary AWS magnet. The driver failed to react to the warning given within the time allowed and the brakes were applied. Because the AWS isolating cock was out of reach of the driver, he instructed the fireman to open it for him. The train's speed had reduced by about 8 miles per hour (13 km/h) when the brakes were released. The rules require that the train is brought to a stand and the signaller contacted in the event of an AWS brake application. Additionally the driver must inform the signaller whenever the AWS is isolated;

"Driver: If it becomes necessary to isolate the AWS, you must:

- stop your train immediately
- tell the signaller
- not move the train until instructed to do so
- carry out the instructions given."

The train then passed signal SN43, which was displaying a single yellow (caution) aspect. The driver acknowledged the AWS warning, but did not reduce speed.

In the twelve seconds between brake application and brake release, the train passed over the fixed AWS magnet for signal SN43, which was displaying a single yellow (caution) aspect. This warning was cancelled in time. The train then passed over the TPWS+ overspeed sensor for signal SN45, which was displaying a red (danger) aspect. As the train was travelling more slowly than the trigger speed, no brake action was demanded from the train. The train then passed over the second TPWS overspeed sensor for signal SN45, this time at 53 miles per hour (85 km/h), which was in excess of the 45 miles per hour (72 km/h) trigger speed. Consequently, a TPWS intervention occurred, but as the AWS isolating cock was open the brakes did not apply. When the driver saw that signal SN45 was at danger, he applied the brakes on the train. Due to there being insufficient distance to stop, the train overran the signal by 600 yards (550 m) and came to a stand across Wootton Basset Junction.

Then the driver reported to the signaller by radio, claiming that the signals had not sequenced properly (i.e. that SN43 had been green). During the time that he was on the radio, the fireman closed the AWS isolating cock. The signaller initially treated the event as a Technical SPAR (i.e., Signal Passed at Red due to an Irregular Signal Sequence) because there was no SPAD alarm provided for signal SN45 and the driver had claimed that the preceding signal was displaying a green aspect. Because this is not a safety-critical event he authorised the driver to take the train forward to Swindon. However, by the time the train arrived at Swindon, it was understood that signal SN45 had been passed at danger without authority and the driver was relieved of his duties. The driver was not tested for the presence of drugs or alcohol in his system, as is required by Railway Group Standards. The investigation found that there was no evidence of alcohol in his system. Prescription drugs that he was taking were assessed as not having an effect on his ability to drive the train. Fatigue was found not to be a factor.

The investigation found that crewing of the train was insufficient. There was no traction inspector on board. WCR had discontinued the use of traction inspectors by 2012. A traction inspector's duties include assisting the driver with the sighting of signals. Two members of the train support crew were also on the footplate of Tangmere, but they had no responsibility in respect of the operation of the train. No problems were found with the ability to sight signals SN43 and SN45. The locomotive and carriages from the train were tested separately following the incident; no fault was found with either, although some of the sensors were not being recorded by the On Train Data Recorder (OTDR). The RAIB were able to reconstruct the sequence of events from the data that was recorded by the OTDR.

The investigation found that the fixed AWS magnet for signal SN43 was incorrectly positioned. It was located 304 yards (278 m) from the signal, instead of the standard 200 yards (180 m). The actual location of signal SN43 was 13 yards (12 m) closer to the junction than shown on signalling diagrams, which was at 83 miles 54 chains (134.66 km) from London. These errors meant that the placing of the AWS magnet for the temporary speed restriction was also incorrect. Instead of being 244 yards (223 m) from the fixed AWS magnet, the temporary AWS magnet for the speed restriction was only 190 yards (170 m) from it. The installation of signal SN43 was in 1978, and the errors had remained undetected since then. An emergency speed restriction had been introduced in January 2015 due to the condition of the track, and had subsequently been converted to a temporary speed restriction. These errors were found not to have been contributory factors in the incident.

The safety culture at WCR was found by the investigation to be weak. This was evidenced by a number of factors, including the lack of traction inspectors, failure to test for drugs and alcohol, failure to download data from OTDRs to analyse individual driver performance, failure to maintain OTDR equipment correctly, failure to report missing seals on safety equipment where they were required to be fitted, failure to keep proper records, and failure to improve following the incident at Bell Busk (detailed below).

== Trains ==
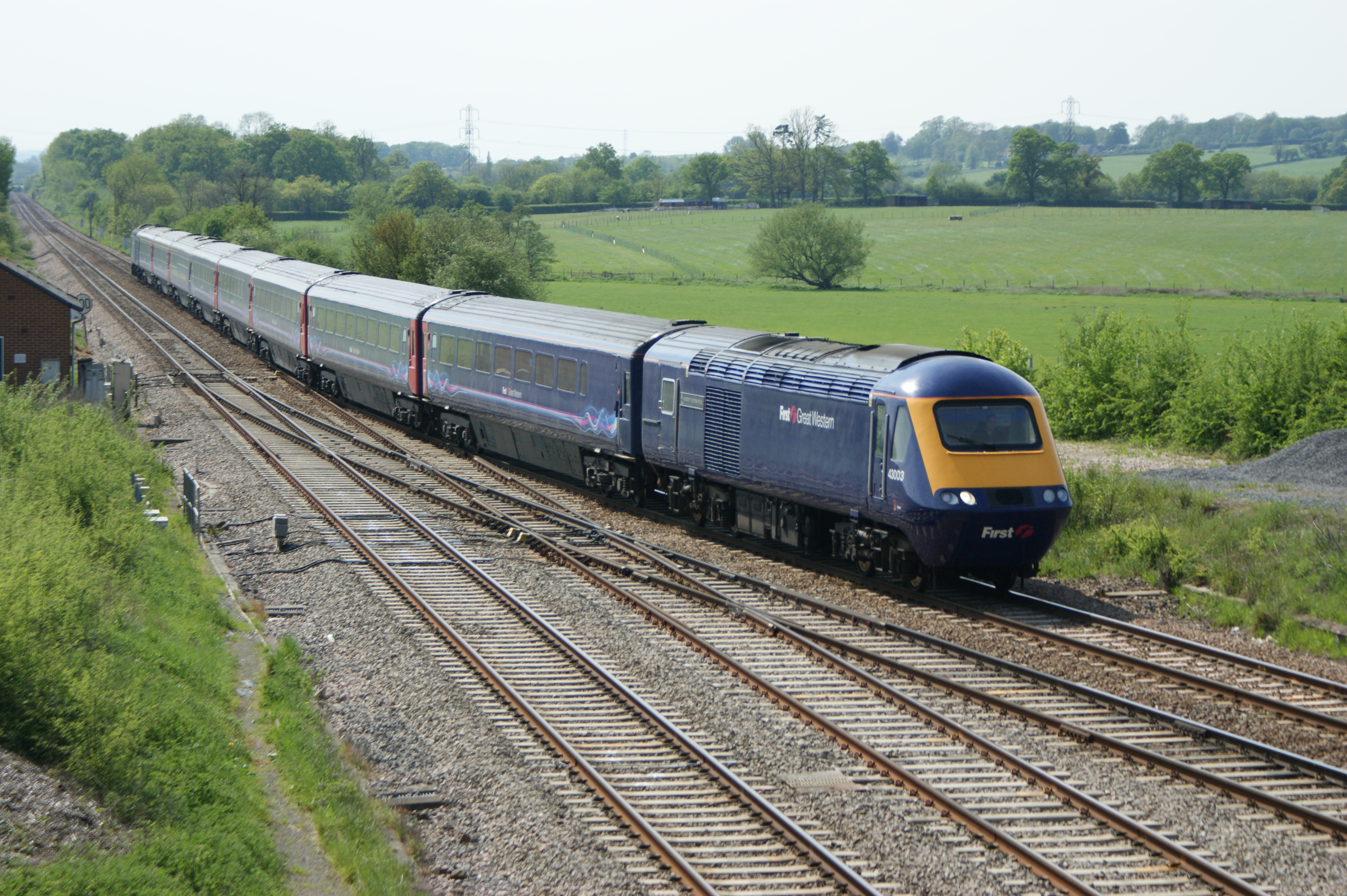
First Great Western HST, similar to that which passed Wootton Bassett Junction a minute before the charter train came to a halt across the junction.

=== Charter train ===
The charter train, reporting number 1Z67, was a steam-hauled passenger train, the 16:35 Cathedrals Express charter from Bristol Temple Meads to Southend East, Essex. The train was hauled by Battle of Britain-class locomotive 34067 Tangmere (TOPS number 98 767). Tangmere was hauling thirteen carriages, which were a mixture of Mk 1s and Mk 2s. The train was operated by WCR. There were 477 passengers and 39 staff on board the train.

=== Service train ===
The service train was the 15:28 Swansea to London Paddington, reporting number 1L76. It was operated by a First Great Western InterCity 125 "High Speed Train", and was carrying about 240 passengers.

== Investigations ==
The Rail Accident Investigation Branch opened an investigation into the incident, which it called a "dangerous occurrence". One aspect of the investigation was whether the seals on the TPWS equipment were already broken before the train departed from Bristol, or were not in place at the time. In March 2016, the RAIB published an update on their investigation. The final report was released in May 2016. Five safety recommendations were made and one learning point was identified.

The Rail Safety and Standards Board opened an investigation into the incident. The ORR opened two investigations; one into WCR's Safety Management System, with the second a criminal investigation. The ORR subsequently charged WCR and the driver of the train with various offences under the Health and Safety at Work etc. Act 1974. WCR also opened an internal investigation into the incident.

== Ban ==
=== Network Rail ===
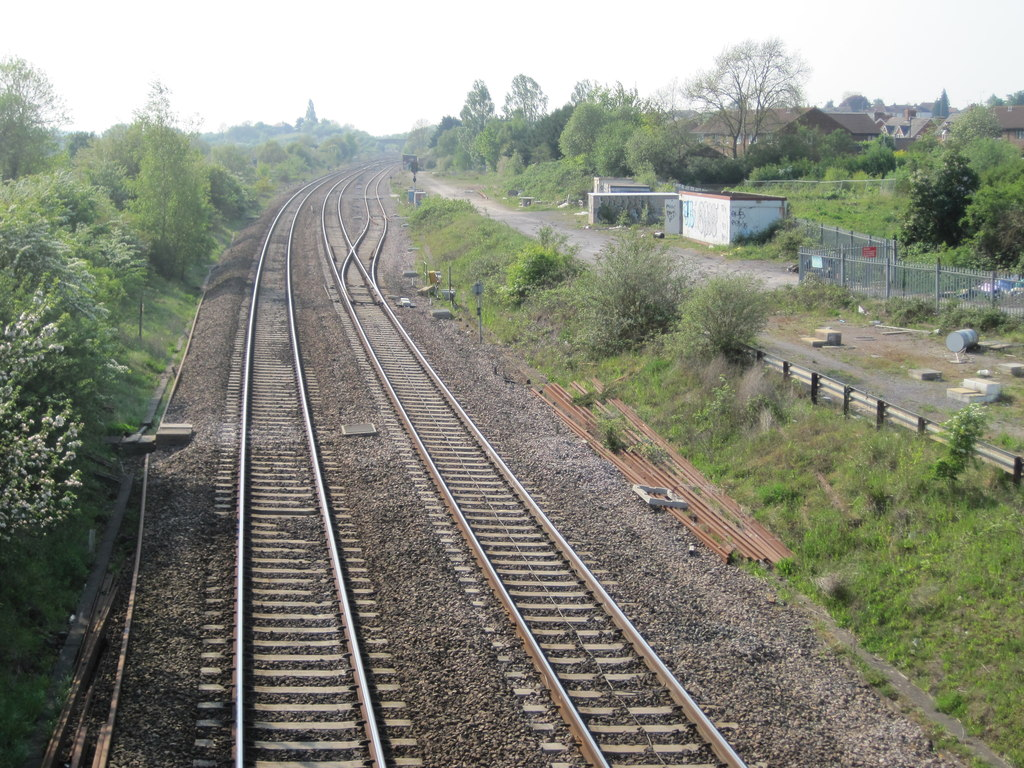
Looking west over Wootton Bassett Junction

Effective midnight on 3 April, NR banned WCR from operating trains anywhere on the British railway network, stating in the suspension notice that "the operations of WCR are a threat to the safe operation of the railway". Seven areas of deficiencies were identified. WCR was required to address five of them and show significant progress towards addressing the other two by 15 May. If this could be achieved, the ban would be lifted. During the period that WCR was banned from the rail network, it was still required to pay Track Access Charges to Network Rail. This was the first time that a train operating company had been banned in the United Kingdom.

Following improvements made by WCR, the ban was lifted on 8 May. A review of progress made was scheduled to be made after 3 months.

=== Office of Rail and Road ===
On 17 April, the ORR took steps to revoke WCR's Safety Certificate. A process of representation was started, with parties having until 15 May to comment. The ORR's opinion was that WCR's Safety Management System "is not able to ensure that services are being operated, designed or maintained safely". On 21 May 2015, the ORR issued WCR an improvement notice under the Railways and Other Guided Transport Systems (Safety) Regulations 2006.

== Previous incident ==
On 12 July 2014, a charter train operated by WCR, reporting number 1Z57, caused a lineside fire at Bell Busk, North Yorkshire, The train was headed by Hall-class locomotive 5972 Olton Hall, which was hauling a charter train from Carnforth, Lancashire to York. The fire was caused by a defect in the locomotive's ash pan which allowed a piece of burning coal to fall from the locomotive and land alongside the track. Following the incident, WCR was served with a Suspension Notice, which had the effect that WCR was banned from operating steam locomotives on that route. It raised the issue with the Access Disputes Committee (ADC), calling Network Rail's actions "partial and malicious". The Suspension Notice was later partly lifted, allowing operation on routes where there was deemed not to be an enhanced fire risk.

An investigation found that the crew of the train had not been advised that there was a raised fire risk at the time. WCR was found not to have co-operated fully with the investigation. The ADC found that WCR's Safety Management System was deficient due to confusion over whether or not the crew of the train had been informed of the increased fire risk. WCR failed to inform Network Rail of its plans to try to prevent future incidents of a similar nature. The ADC found that this was in breach of WCR's Safety Management System. WCR chairman David Smith instructed his staff that no further correspondence would be gone into over the matter. The ADC found that this instruction was prejudicial to the safe operation of WCR's Safety Management System. The instruction was later rescinded. WCR was also found to be in breach of its Track Access Contract.

== Fallout ==
At the time of the ban, WCR operated about 90% of all steam charter operations on Britain's railways. DB Schenker was the only other operator licensed to run steam trains on Network Rail tracks. DB Schenker has a policy of only operating air braked trains, whereas many trains operated by WCR use vacuum brakes, which meant that DB Schenker was unable to operate those charters in place of WCR.

Steam Railway editor Howard Johnston said that the aftermath of the SPAD represented "possibly the greatest challenge to our movement". ASLEF General Secretary Mick Whelan called for better regulation of crew driving charter trains. Following the ban, eighteen charters were cancelled and eleven were postponed in the period 4 April – 5 May. DB Schenker and GB Railfreight operated three charters each. Companies affected included Belmond, Compass, NENTA Traintours, PMR Railtours, Railway Touring Company, SRPS Railtours, Statesman Rail, Steam Dreams and Vintage Trains.

On 6 May, it was reported that The Jacobite season was likely to start late due to the suspension. The trains, which run on the West Highland Line in Scotland, were due to start running on 11 May for the start of the 2015 season. Following the lifting of the ban on 8 May, it was announced that The Jacobite trains would run as scheduled from 11 May.

In May 2015, Abellio ScotRail announced that as a result of the ban, it was reconsidering its decision to give WCR preferred bidder status for a contract to run steam trains on the Waverley Line, which was scheduled to reopen between Edinburgh and Tweedbank in September 2015.

In June 2015, it was reported that the ORR was planning to call a "Safety Summit" involving operators of charter trains on NR tracks. It was reported that one proposal to be put forward by the ORR was that all charter trains be limited to a maximum of eleven carriages. This, if enacted, would mean a loss of revenue of up to £5,000 per train for operators. Part of the reasoning behind the proposal was that steam locomotives have a lower rate of acceleration than modern traction. As they are limited to 75 miles per hour (121 km/h), they have to be worked harder in order to maintain time. A reduction in train weight would make acceleration rates a little faster and reduce the need to work locomotives so hard.

Despite many requests from Rail, WCR chairman David Smith refused to comment on the incident. In an interview with Steam Railway, he stated that the company was working to satisfy the seven demands made by Network Rail, and was only cancelling trains about a week in advance, in the hope that WCR would be able to run trains again in the future. Responding to a comment by Smith that "We are co-operating with the ORR in its enquiries, but from what we can see, all it is doing is keeping a watchful eye on what is going on", Rail editor Nigel Harris expressed astonishment at the "jaw-dropping" comments as criminal charges could lead to imprisonment following a guilty verdict. The reputational damage to WCR was described as "possibly commercially fatal". Rail contributor Pip Dunn said that WCR refused to talk to journalists when negative stories concerning the company were being reported, yet was happy to when publicising a charter it was running. On 28 May, WCR issued a press release apologising for the distress, disappointment and inconvenience caused by the incident and events arising from it. It also thanked the ORR and others for assistance and support given. It stated that it was giving full assistance to the RAIB in respect of its investigation into the SPAD.

In April 2015, the ORR was considering whether or not to prosecute WCR, and subsequently decided to prosecute both WCR and the driver of the train. Although the suspension had been lifted by NR, the ORR could still have revoked WCR's Safety Certificate at the end of the 28-day consultation period. The lifting of the suspension by NR was subject to a review after three months.

=== Great Britain VIII ===
Great Britain VIII was a nine-day railtour, one of an annual series, from London to Cornwall, then to Scotland, and back to London. Various steam locomotives were scheduled to haul the train on each day of the tour, which was to have been entirely steam-hauled. Participants paid between £1,995 and £2,895 per person for the nine-day tour, which ran from 28 April to 6 May 2015. Despite fears that the tour would be cancelled, it was run although with changes to the locomotives hauling it. DB Schenker agreed to operate the first two days of the tour. The tour suffered a number of issues including steam locomotives being replaced by diesels, and a lack of train heating; these resulted in a significant number of passengers leaving the tour early.

== Subsequent incident and further ban ==
On 2 October 2015, Black 5 steam locomotive 45231 Sherwood Forester was working a WCR special through Doncaster when it was noticed that its TPWS had been isolated by the fireman. As a result, in November 2015 a further prohibition notice was issued to WCR by the ORR, suspending further steam services operated by them. It was reported that locomotives would need to have their TPWS modified to prevent the crew from being able to isolate it, before this suspension could be lifted.

On 17 February 2016, the ORR served a Prohibition Notice on WCR, citing a further seven incidents which had occurred since the SPAD at Wootton Bassett. The prohibition was to become effective from 18 February 2016 meaning that WCR would "no longer be able to operate trains on the mainline network until such a time as [WCR] can satisfy [the ORR] that its governance and operations meet industry practice and are fit for the scale of its operations". In addition the ORR found that the conditions for the revocation of WCR's safety certificate had been met, which could have implications for WCR's European train operator's licence. This second prohibition was lifted on 23 March 2016.

== Prosecution ==
On 9 December 2015, the ORR announced that WCR and the driver of the train were to be prosecuted for offences contrary to the Health and Safety at Work etc. Act 1974. An initial hearing was scheduled to be heard at Swindon Magistrates Court on 11 January 2016, but postponed until 20 January. When the case opened, neither the driver, nor WCR, entered pleas. The case was committed to Swindon Crown Court, where it was scheduled to be heard on 19 February; unconditional bail was granted to the driver. The case was subsequently postponed until 18 March, and then further postponed to an undisclosed date in May 2016. In late May, it was announced that the trial would begin on 27 June 2016.

At the trial, both WCR and the driver pleaded guilty. WCR were fined £200,000 plus costs of £64,000. The fine imposed was half of the maximum that could have been imposed. This was decided by Judge Peter Blair QC after he took mitigating circumstances into account. Rail columnist Christian Wolmar was later to describe the fine as "derisory", He opined that WCR should have had its licence to operate withdrawn. The driver was sentenced to four months imprisonment, suspended for eighteen months. He was also ordered to do 80 hours unpaid work. The driver's counsel stated in court that "he would never drive trains again".
