= Wootton Bassett railway stations =

Wootton Bassett railway stations may refer to:

- Wootton Bassett Road railway station, temporary railway station in England opened from 1840 to 1841
- Wootton Bassett Junction railway station, railway station in England opened from 1841 to 1965
