= Aldbourne Heritage Centre =

Coordinates: 51.5417°N 1.9049°W

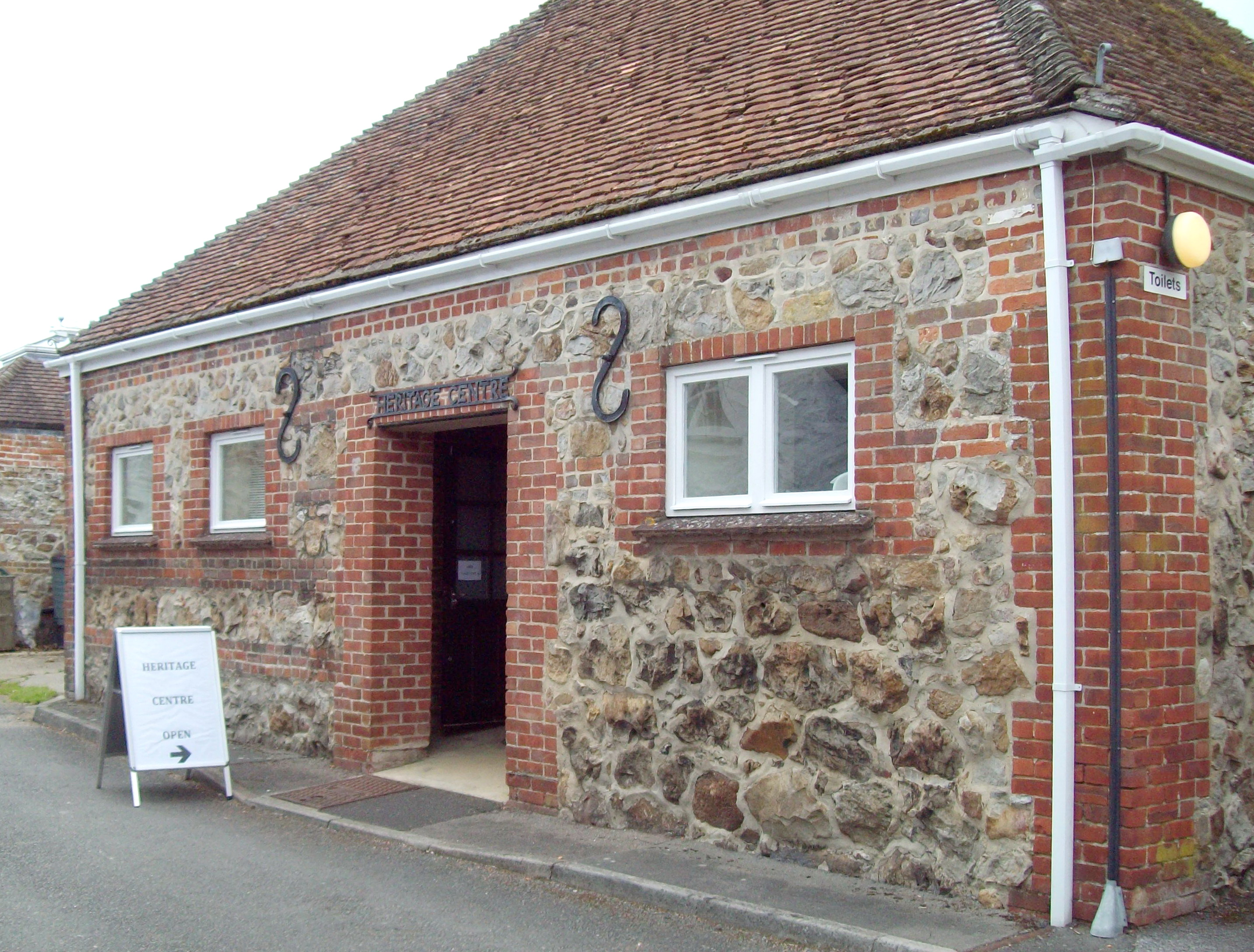
The Aldbourne Heritage Centre

Aldbourne Heritage Centre is a local museum in North-East Wiltshire, England, next to The Crown Inn in the centre of Aldbourne.

== History ==
It opened in August 2014, presenting objects and displays which provide insights into the history of Aldbourne from prehistoric times to the present day. It is managed by the Aldbourne Community Heritage Group (ACHG), which also organises talks and events on topics related to local history.

== Partners ==
The Heritage Centre is a member of the South Western Federation of Museums and Art Galleries. In 2015 it was a partner in Wiltshire Museum's project "Wiltshire's Story in 100 Objects", a touring exhibition celebrating the rich history of the county, having provided an 18th-century crotal bell cast in Aldbourne as one of the 100 objects.

== Exhibitions ==
The Centre presents a changing set of displays, covering a diverse range of subjects, such as:

- the Aldbourne Cup – a finely-decorated incense cup from the early Bronze Age found in a local barrow;
- the geology forming the pond and village, and the legend of the dabchick and its relevance to the village;
- the story of Charles McEvoy's lost play "The Village Wedding" and its recent discovery;
- court cases between local tenants and The Crown in 1560 (Queen Elizabeth) and 1607 (King James I);
- stories of the inhabitants of Aldbourne at the time of the Enclosure Acts in the early 19th century;
- the development of local industries such as fustian-weaving and chair-making;
- the important bell founding industry which operated in Aldbourne from the 17th–19th centuries;
- the effects of fires in the village from the 18th century to the present day;
- the history of established religion, non-conformism and dissension in the village; and
- the residence in Aldbourne of Easy Company of the US Army 101st Airborne Division (later popularised in book and film as Band of Brothers) in the lead up to D-Day, and other military units during both World Wars.

Objects on display include prehistoric flints used as tools and recovered from local Bronze Age barrows; two replicas of the Aldbourne Cup, one in its current, aged and reconstructed state, and a second in its original state (the original is on display at the British Museum); copies of mediaeval and Tudor documents relating to the exercise of manorial rights by the Duchy of Lancaster and the judgments of manorial courts; a range of hand-bells and crotal bells made in Aldbourne by the Corr and Wells families (and others); a 19th-century fireman’s helmet; items of Victorian (and earlier) agricultural hand tools; items relating to the wartime residence of US military personnel in the village; and thousands of photographs of life in Aldbourne from the mid-Victorian period to the present day.

== Opening times ==
The centre is open on Saturdays, Sundays and Bank Holidays throughout the summer. Visits at other times can be arranged by appointment.

== See also ==
- List of museums in Wiltshire
