= Jingle bell =

Type of bell

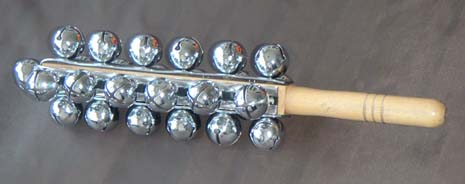
Jingle bells as a musical instrument

An audio sample of jingle bells

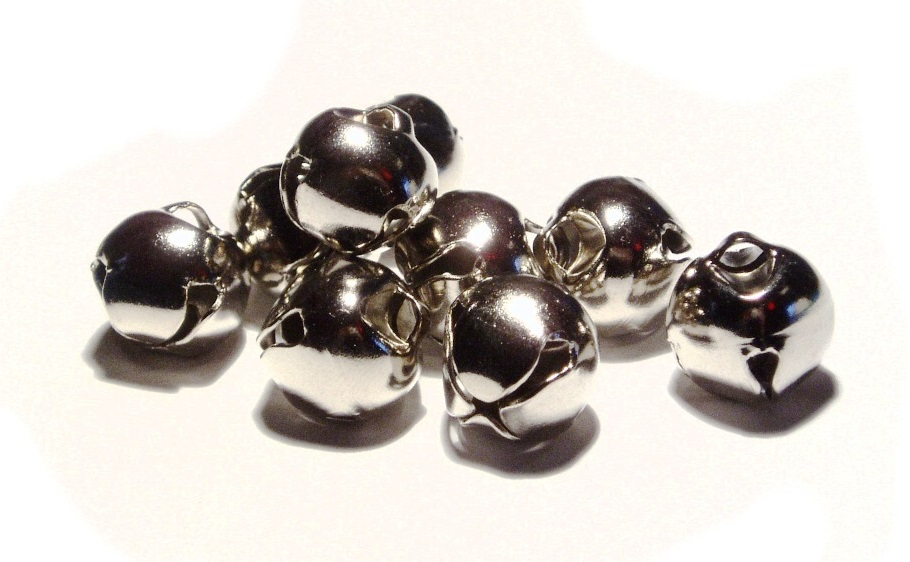
Sleigh bells

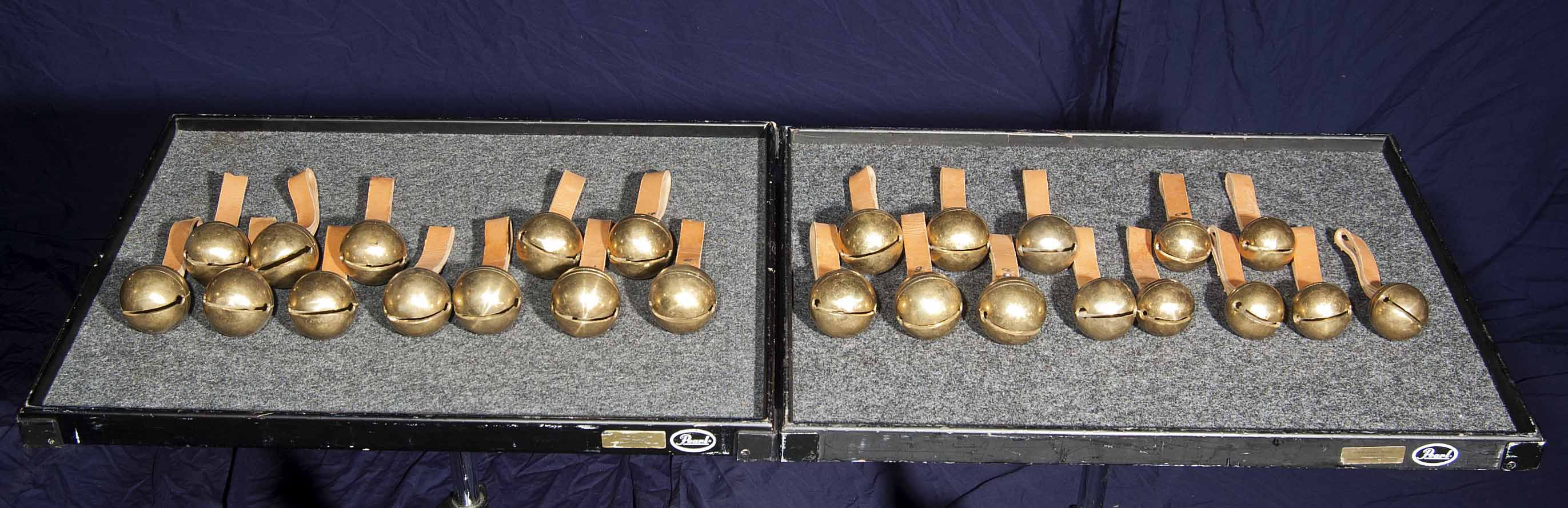
Tuned chromatic sleigh bells, range F4–F6

Four jingle bells around the anvil in the coat of arms of Nurmo

A jingle bell or sleigh bell is a type of bell which produces a distinctive 'jingle' sound, especially in large numbers. They find use in many areas as a percussion instrument, including the classic sleigh bell sound and morris dancing. They are typically used as a cheaper alternative to small 'classic' bells.

The simplest jingle bells are produced from a single piece of sheet metal bent into a roughly spherical shape to contain a small ball bearing or short piece of metal rod. This method of production results in the classic two- or four-leaved shape. Two halves may also be crimped together, resulting in a ridge around the middle. A glass marble may also be used as the ringer on larger bells.

== History ==
Bells of this type were developed centuries ago from the European crotal bell for fastening to harnesses used with horses or teams of horses. Typically they were used for horse-drawn vehicles, such as carriages and sleighs. The bell was designed to make a jingly sound whenever the horse and thus the vehicle was in motion. The purpose was perhaps to herald the approach of someone important, or likely to warn pedestrians of the vehicle's approach so that they might step aside to avoid collisions and potential injuries. This was especially important for sleighs, which otherwise make almost no sound as they travel over packed snow, and are difficult to stop quickly. This instrument was also used for fun by children in games and songs.

== Uses ==
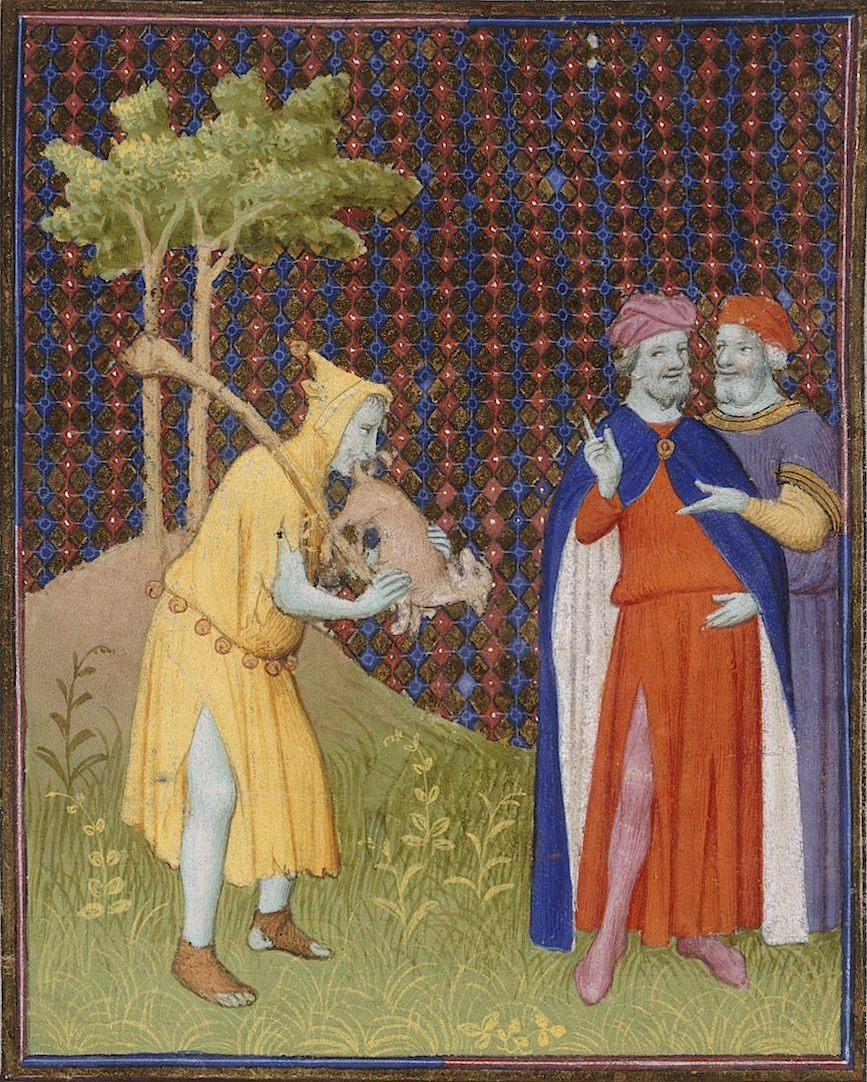
1405-1425, France. Jester with bells around his waist, playing a dog-shaped bagpipe.

Jingle bells commonly appear on Christmas decorations or as Christmas ornaments themselves, or hung around the neck like a necklace. They can also be strung onto a heavy wire and bent into a wreath shape, usually with a metal bow. Rather than the cross-shaped opening in the bottom, other designs may be cut into the bell, such as a snowflake. Small designs like stars may also be cut into the upper part of the bell. Bells were also added to the dangling sleeves and announced the appearance of a court jester.

A jingle bell sewn onto clothing can function as a button for fastening: a bell button.

In classical music, Gustav Mahler makes use of jingle/sleigh bells in his Symphony No. 4 of 1901; Sergei Prokofiev calls for sleigh bells in his Lieutenant Kijé Suite of 1934.

In the US state of Massachusetts the law requires the installation of jingle bells on horse-drawn sleighs.

== See also ==
- Jingle (percussion)
- Crotal bell
- Ghungroo
- Suzu (bell)
