= List of museums in Wiltshire =

This list of museums in Wiltshire, England contains museums which are defined for this context as institutions (including nonprofit organizations, government entities, and private businesses) that collect and care for objects of cultural, artistic, scientific, or historical interest and make their collections or related exhibits available for public viewing. Also included are non-profit art galleries and university art galleries. Museums that exist only in cyberspace (i.e., virtual museums) are not included.

== Museums ==
Name	Photograph	Town/City	Region	Type	Summary
Aldbourne Heritage Centre		Aldbourne	Wiltshire	Local	Local history, culture, collections of bells
Alexander Keiller Museum at Avebury		Avebury	Wiltshire	Archaeology	Prehistoric artifacts, most found at Avebury, also history of the site
Arundells		Salisbury	Wiltshire	Historic house	18th-century home of former Prime Minister Sir Edward Heath, who lived there from 1985, features his furnishings and personal collections
Athelstan Museum		Malmesbury	Wiltshire	Local	local history, culture, collections of lace, coins, bicycles and tricycles
Atwell-Wilson Motor Museum		Calne	Wiltshire	Transportation	classic and rare cars, lorries, motorcycles, mopeds, push bikes, memorabilia
Avebury Manor and Garden		Avebury	Wiltshire	Historic house	Operated by the National Trust, early 16th-century manor house and early 20th-century garden
Bedwyn Stone Museum		Great Bedwyn	Wiltshire	Art	information, carved stone decorations and pieces
Boscombe Down Aviation Collection		Old Sarum Airfield	Wiltshire	Aerospace	restored aircraft, vehicles and artefacts related to RAF Boscombe Down
Bowood House		Derry Hill	Wiltshire	Historic house	Georgian country house with interiors by Robert Adam and a garden designed by Capability Brown
Bradford on Avon Museum		Bradford on Avon	Wiltshire	Local	local history, natural history, recreated Victorian pharmacy shop
Calne Heritage Centre		Calne	Wiltshire	Local	local history, art
Chippenham Museum		Chippenham	Wiltshire	Local	local history, culture
Chiseldon Museum		Chiseldon	Wiltshire	Local	local history
Corsham almshouses & 17th-century schoolroom		Corsham	Wiltshire	Historic house	17th-century almshouses and period schoolroom
Corsham Court		Corsham	Wiltshire	Historic house	16th-century country house known for its art collection, landscape designed by Capability Brown
Corsham Information and Heritage Centre		Corsham	Wiltshire	Local	local history and information centre
Cricklade Museum		Cricklade	Wiltshire	Local	local history, culture
Crofton Pumping Station		Great Bedwyn	Wiltshire	Technology	Early 19th-century steam-powered pumping station with working engines
Great Chalfield Manor		Great Chalfield, Atworth	Wiltshire	Historic house	Operated by the National Trust, 15th-century moated manor house, gardens
Kennet and Avon Canal Museum		Devizes	Wiltshire	Transportation	History and heritage of the Kennet and Avon Canal
Lacock Abbey, Fox Talbot Museum & Village		Lacock	Wiltshire	Multiple	Operated by the National Trust, medieval country home and former abbey, picturesque rural village, museum of photography pioneer William Henry Fox Talbot and photography exhibits
Lackham Museum of Agriculture and Rural Life		Lacock	Wiltshire	Agriculture	information, based at Wiltshire College Lackham, displays of farming, agriculture, rural trades and rural life
Little Clarendon		Dinton	Wiltshire	Historic house	operated by the National Trust, late 15th-century stone house and chapel
Longleat		Horningsham	Wiltshire	Historic house	Elizabethan country house, maze, landscaped parkland and safari park
Lydiard House		Swindon	Swindon	Historic house	Palladian stately home with restored state rooms, ground-floor apartments, changing exhibits of local art, culture
Market Lavington Village Museum		Market Lavington	Wiltshire	Local	local history, culture, rural trades, agriculture, domestic life
Merchant's House, Marlborough		Marlborough	Wiltshire	Historic house	17th-century-period merchant's house
Mere Museum		Mere	Wiltshire	Local	local history
Museum of Computing		Swindon	Swindon	Science	History of computing and digital development including the Internet and video games
Mompesson House		Salisbury	Wiltshire	Historic house	Operated by the National Trust, 18th-century Queen Anne house with period furniture, collection of drinking glasses, walled garden
Museum & Art Swindon		Swindon	Swindon	Art	Holds the Swindon Collection of Modern British Art, and covers local history, archaeology and geology.
Oxfam Art Gallery		Salisbury	Wiltshire	Art	operated by Oxfam
Pewsey Heritage Centre		Pewsey	Wiltshire	Local	Pewsey Heritage Centre, has a collection that covers local history, social history, and agricultural history of the Vale of Pewsey.
Philipps House		Dinton	Wiltshire	Historic house	Operated by the National Trust, early 19th-century Neo-Grecian country house with collection of Regency furniture and furnishings, park
The Pound		Corsham	Wiltshire	Art	performing arts centre with exhibit gallery
Purton Museum		Purton	Wiltshire	Local	local history, domestic life, agriculture
Railway Village Museum		Swindon	Swindon	Historic house	Victorian railway worker's cottage.
REME Museum		MoD Lyneham	Wiltshire	Military	Artifacts used by the Royal Electrical and Mechanical Engineers including communications equipment, computers, vehicles, weapons
Richard Jefferies Museum		Coate	Swindon	Historic house	birthplace home and museum of writer and naturalist Richard Jefferies
The Rifles Berkshire and Wiltshire Museum		Salisbury	Wiltshire	Military	regimental artifacts and history of the Royal Gloucestershire, Berkshire and Wiltshire Regiment, now part of The Rifles; also known as The Wardrobe Military Museum
Salisbury Museum		Salisbury	Wiltshire	Multiple	Archaeology, Stonehenge and prehistory, art, decorative arts, Roman, Saxon and medieval history, social history, costumes, anthropology. Nationally important collections as recognised by the Designation Scheme.
Salisbury Arts Centre		Salisbury	Wiltshire	Art	performing and visual arts centre
Science Museum at Wroughton		Wroughton	Swindon	Science	Features large objects of the Science Museum (London), open only by pre-booked tours in the summer
STEAM - Museum of the Great Western Railway		Swindon	Swindon	Railway	Historic locomotives, rolling stock, memorabilia, reconstructed work areas, history of the Great Western Railway
Stourhead		Stourton	Wiltshire	Historic house	Operated by the National Trust, Palladian mansion featuring a Regency library with collections of Chippendale furniture and paintings, 18th-century landscape gardens on a 2,650 acre (11 km²) estate
Swindon and Cricklade Railway		Blunsdon	Swindon	Railway	Heritage railway with museum exhibits open on special events at the Blunsdon railway station
Trowbridge Museum		Trowbridge	Wiltshire	Textile	Equipment and exhibits about the local textile industry
Warminster Museum		Warminster	Wiltshire	Local	local history, geology, also known as the Warminster Dewey Museum, operated by the Warminster Historical Society and housed in Warminster Library
The Well House Collection		Melksham	Wiltshire	Local	artefacts, exhibits, large interactive photograph collection celebrating Melksham's history, housed in an Edwardian manor. Teas, coffees and refreshments available
Westbury Visitor Centre		Westbury	Wiltshire	Local	local history displays and visitor centre
Westwood Manor		Westwood	Wiltshire	Historic house	Operated by the National Trust, 15th-century manor house built over three centuries, features period furniture, later tapestries, modern topiary garden
Wilton Carpet Factory Museum		Wilton	Wiltshire	Industry	information, information, in the same place as the Wilton Town Museum, history and tours of the Wilton Carpet Factory
Wilton House		Wilton	Wiltshire	Historic house	Palladian country house with state rooms, art, sculpture, furnishings, gardens and parkland
Wilton Town Museum		Wilton	Wiltshire	Local	information, in the same place as the Wilton Carpet Museum, local history
Wilton Windmill		Wilton	Wiltshire	Mill	Early 19th-century five floor brick tower windmill
Wiltshire Museum		Devizes	Wiltshire	Multiple	Formerly known as Devizes Museum; archaeology, art, local history, social history and natural history of Wiltshire. Nationally important collections as recognised by the Designation Scheme.
Wootton Bassett Museum		Wootton Bassett	Wiltshire	Local	Local history, culture
Young Gallery		Salisbury	Wiltshire	Art	housed at Salisbury Library, exhibits of 19th-century images of Salisbury by artist Edward Young, John Creasey Museum, contemporary British artists and students, with an emphasis on art with a Wiltshire connection

== Defunct museums ==
- Castle Combe Museum, Castle Combe, closed in 2012.
- Coate Agricultural Museum at Coate WaterCountry Park, closed and subsequently destroyed by fire in December 2016.

== See also ==
- Category:Tourist attractions in Wiltshire
