= Wootton Bassett Museum =

Municipal building in Wootton Bassett, Wiltshire, England

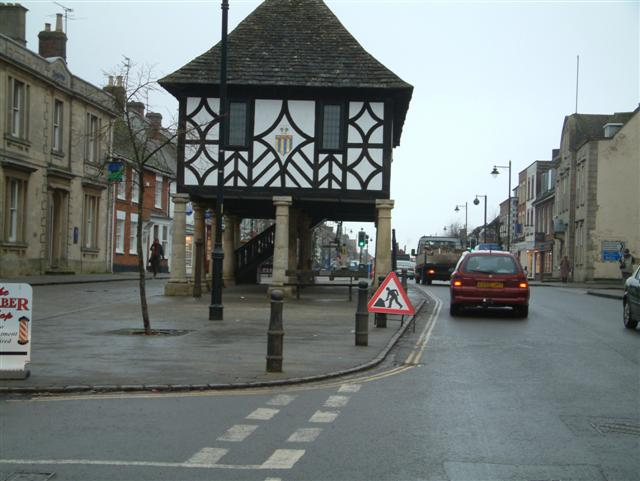
- The old Town Hall, now the Wootton Bassett Museum

- Shown in Wiltshire
- 51.5417°N 1.9049°W
- Location: Royal Wootton Bassett, Wiltshire, England

History
- Built: 1690

Listed Building – Grade II
- Designated: 17 January 1955
- Reference no.: 1363658

Wootton Bassett Museum is a local museum in the market town of Royal Wootton Bassett, Wiltshire, England. It is housed in the town hall which is a Grade II listed building.

== History ==
The town hall was a gift to the town from Laurence Hyde, 1st Earl of Rochester, who had served as Member of Parliament for Wootton Basset, and was built in 1690. The design involved an open ground floor and an upper storey supported on 15 tapered oolite columns. The ground floor was the venue for local butter and cheese markets and the upper storey served as both a council chamber and a courthouse. Facilities on the ground floor included a "blind house" under the staircase where drunkards were held until they were completely sober and a storage facility for the hand-worked fire engine.

Wootton Bassett had a very small electorate and two dominant patrons, John Villiers, 3rd Earl of Clarendon of The Grove, Watford and Henry St John, 4th Viscount Bolingbroke of Lydiard Park, which meant it was recognised by the UK Parliament as a rotten borough. Its right to elect members of parliament was removed by the Reform Act 1832, and the borough council, which had met in the courtroom, was abolished under the Municipal Corporations Act 1883.

By the late 19th century, the building was in an extremely dilapidated state and under threat of demolition, before being extensively restored by Thomas Lansdown, on behalf of the socialite, Lady Meux and her husband, in 1889. (Note: Lady Meux's husband, Sir Henry Bruce Meux, 3rd Baronet, who came from a brewing family, owned a large estate on the Marlborough Downs as well as the Royal Oak Hotel and many other properties in Wootton Bassett.) The restoration included the removal of both the "blind house" under the stairs and the storage facility for the hand-worked fire engine, thereby creating a completely open space on the ground floor.

The town hall was used as a meeting place by Cricklade and Wootton Bassett Rural District Council until 1972, when it fell vacant after the council converted the old primary school building in Station Road into a Civic Centre. Following an initiative by Dr Alan Stebbens, the then Chairman of Wootton Bassett Historical Society, the Wootton Bassett Museum was established in the empty town hall later that year.

The museum subsequently built up a photographic collection covering life in Wootton Bassett during the 19th and 20th centuries as well as a ducking stool dating from 1686, geological items, stocks, and a whipping post. It also created a scale model of Wootton Bassett railway station as it would have looked before closure in 1965.

== See also ==
- List of museums in Wiltshire
