= Mud Spring =

Mud Spring may refer to:

- a former name of El Dorado, California
- a location in Garrison, Utah that is on the National Register of Historic Places
- Mud Spring (Antelope Valley) Los Angeles County, California.
- Wootton Bassett Mud Spring in England
