= Royal Wootton Bassett Academy =

Location
- Lime Kiln; Royal Wootton Bassett, Wiltshire, SN4 7HG; England; 51°32′53″N 1°54′09″W

Information
- Type: Academy
- Motto: A Global School in a Local Community
- Opened: 1958
- Department for Education URN: 136911 Tables
- Ofsted: Reports
- Head teacher: Anita Ellis
- Gender: Mixed
- Age: 11 to 18
- Enrolment: 1748 (July 2023)
- Houses: Winterbourne; Compton; Berwick; Wootton; Bassett
- Colours: Black, Burgundy, Gold
- Website: www.rwba.org.uk

Royal Wootton Bassett Academy (RWBA) (formerly Wootton Bassett School) is a mixed secondary school and sixth form in the town of Royal Wootton Bassett, Wiltshire, England, for students aged 11 to 18. With over 1,700 pupils, it is one of the largest in Wiltshire.

== History ==
The first school on the Lime Kiln site was opened in January 1958 as Wootton Bassett County Secondary School, for pupils aged 11 and over. Until then, children attended either all-age schools (two in the town and six in surrounding villages) or the grammar schools in other towns. At first there were 279 pupils but numbers increased in the following years.

The school became a comprehensive in 1972 and was renamed Wootton Bassett School. Pupil numbers continued to increase and a new building, financed as a PFI partnership and built on the earlier school's playing fields, was completed in February 2002; Princess Anne performed an official opening in September of that year.

Under the Specialist Schools programme, the school gained Technology College status in 2004.

The school converted to academy status in 2011 and is run by Ascend Learning Trust, which also runs one of the town's primary schools, Noremarsh Junior School.

== Ofsted inspections ==
The school was assessed by Ofsted as 'good' in all areas in November 2024. The inspection report identified three areas for improvement: adapting the curriculum to support special needs pupils; checking pupils' understanding through assessment in the classroom; and internal monitoring of the quality of some aspects of the school's work.

== Facilities ==
The facilities include an AstroTurf sports pitch and numerous sports facilities catering for tennis, cricket, football, rugby and hockey. The sixth form centre has classrooms and a lecture theatre with retractable chairs in the Sixth Form area, also used as a drama studio.

== Administrative structure ==
The school has a Lower School, Upper School and Sixth Form.

The school operates a system of tutor groups, each tutor having approximately 30 students. Tutors rarely teach students from their own group. The main role of groups is to create a stable peer system, with each aiming to tutor the same group throughout their five years. These tutor groups change if students leave to sixth form.

== House system ==
There are five houses, each led by a head of house, named Winterbourne, Compton, Wootton, Berwick and Bassett. They compete in a year-long series of competitions and events, often raising money for charities.
