= Cathedrals Express =

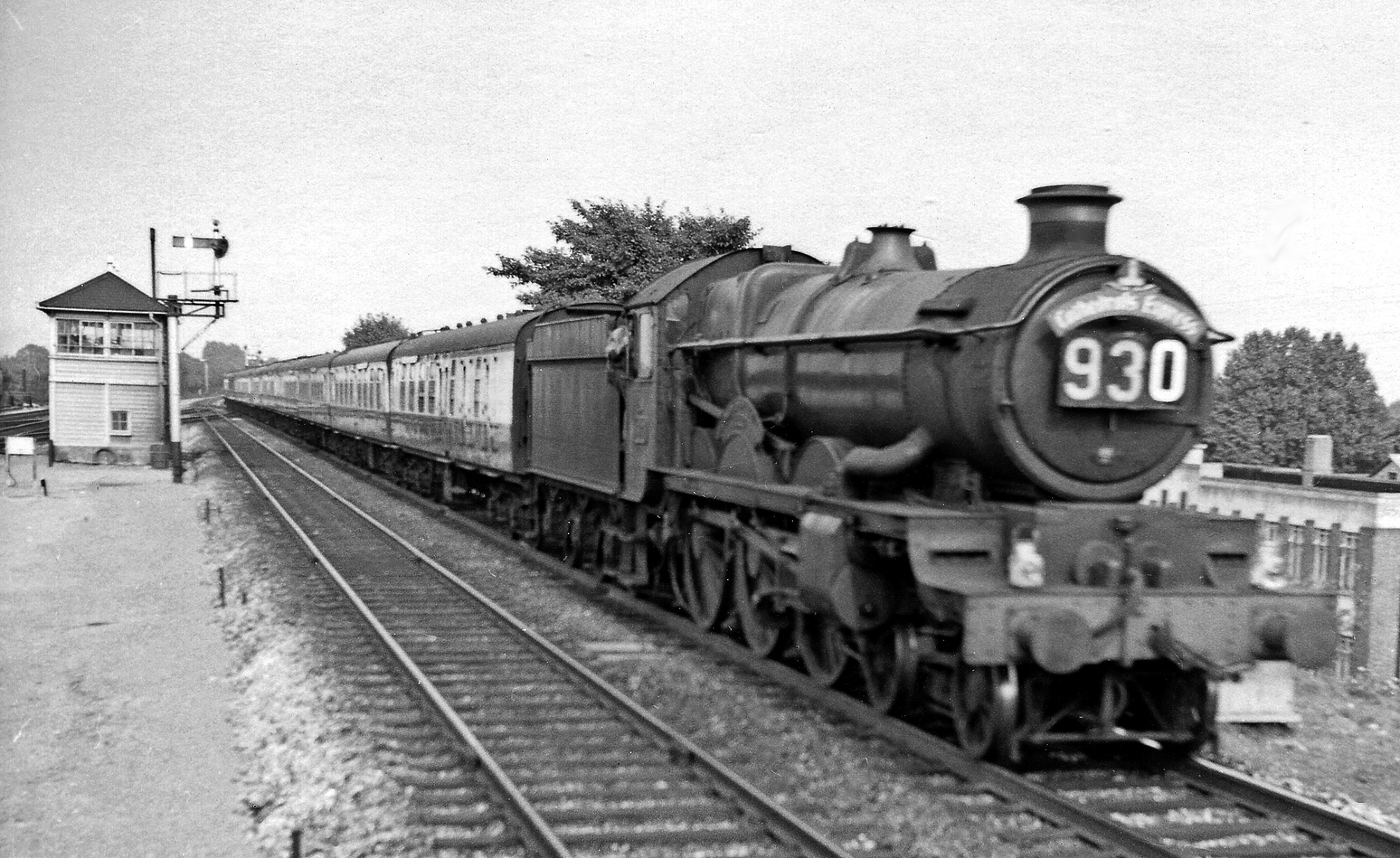
- Down Cathedrals Express at Maidenhead in July 1959, hauled by Castle class 5071 Spitfire

Overview
- Service type: Passenger train
- First service: 16 September 1957
- Last service: 12 June 1965
- Former operator(s): British Railways

Route
- Termini: London Paddington; Hereford
- Distance travelled: 152 miles (245 km)
- Service frequency: Daily
- Line(s) used: Cotswold Line

The Cathedrals Express was a named passenger express introduced in 1957 on the Western Region of British Railways. It connected the cathedral cities of Hereford and Worcester to London Paddington.

The service started on 16 September 1957 and was operated six days a week. It departed Hereford at 07:45 with the return service leaving Paddington at 16:45. Coaching stock was in the Great Western Railway chocolate and cream livery, not the British Railways standard maroon of this period.

The service also stopped at Oxford, another cathedral city, although this was already well-served by other London services. Although a named train, the Cathedrals Express was by no means a fast service throughout. Between Hereford and Worcester it was at most a semi-fast.

In later years the number of stops increased. The timetable in summer 1963 was: Hereford (d. 08:00), Ledbury, Colwall, Great Malvern, Malvern Link, Worcester Foregate Street, Worcester Shrub Hill (d. 09:10), Evesham, Moreton-in-Marsh, Oxford, Reading and Paddington (a. 11:55; 12:09 on Saturdays) – returning from Paddington at 17:15 and reaching Hereford at 20:59 (21:18 on Saturdays).

There was a restaurant car service east of Worcester. Through carriages from Kidderminster to London and vice versa were also attached/detached at Worcester. It operated until 12 June 1965.

Great Western Railway re-introduced a named Cathedrals Express service Mondays to Fridays between Hereford and London Paddington via Worcester and Oxford. The train departs Hereford at 06:42, returning from London Paddington at 18:22 and is currently operated by a Class 800.

== Headboard ==
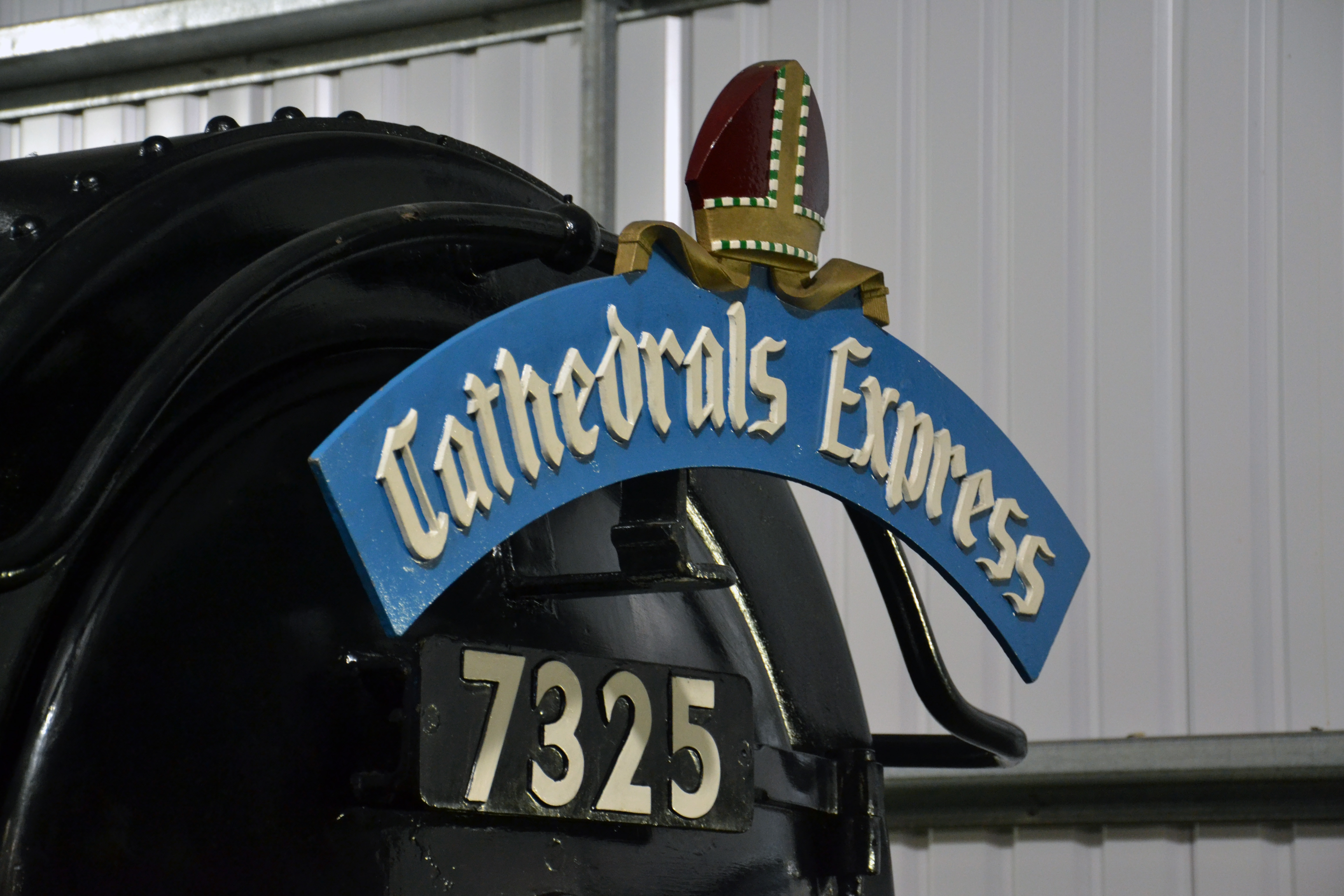
Modern reproduction of the original headboard

This was the last named express with a headboard to be introduced on British Railways in the steam era.

The headboard design was unusual and somewhat ecclesiastical in design. It did not have the usual border around it and its distinctive feature was the use of a blackletter font, not otherwise used for headboards. The headboard was surmounted by a bishop's mitre as a crest in relief. It was the only train in Britain to carry the image of a bishop's mitre. Three dimensional crests were relatively uncommon on British headboards, although used more on the Western Region than elsewhere.

== Railtours ==
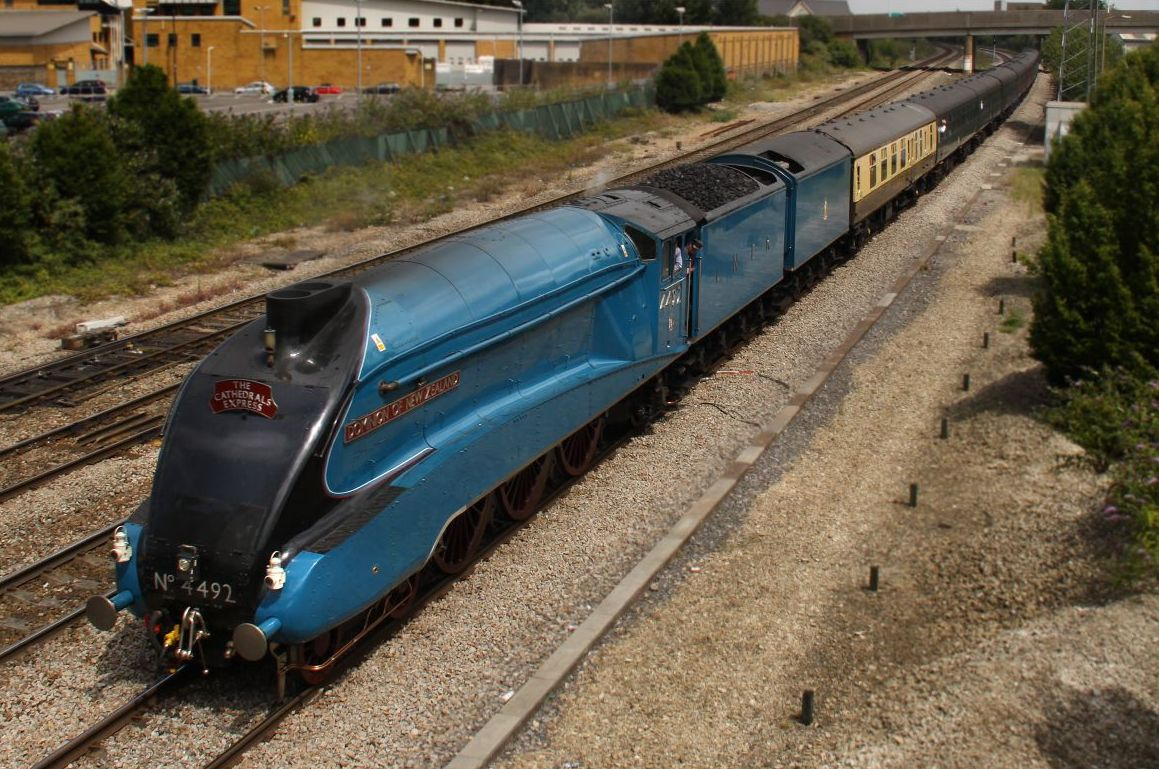
A garter blue A4 arrives at Cardiff on a Steam Dreams Cathedrals Express

After the withdrawal of mainline steam services, the name Cathedrals Express was used for a number of steam-hauled railtours in the area of the Welsh Marches. As the area is scenic, rural, with attractive destination cities and running over lightly trafficked lines, it was a popular venue.

In recent years, the name Cathedrals Express has been used by Steam Dreams for regular railtours in a variety of locations. One of these, operated by the West Coast Railways (WCR), was the scene of the 2015 Wootton Bassett SPAD incident which led to the suspension of WCR's operating licence.

Great Western Railway also use the name for scheduled diesel services from Hereford (see above).
