= Dowris Hoard =

Bronze Age hoard

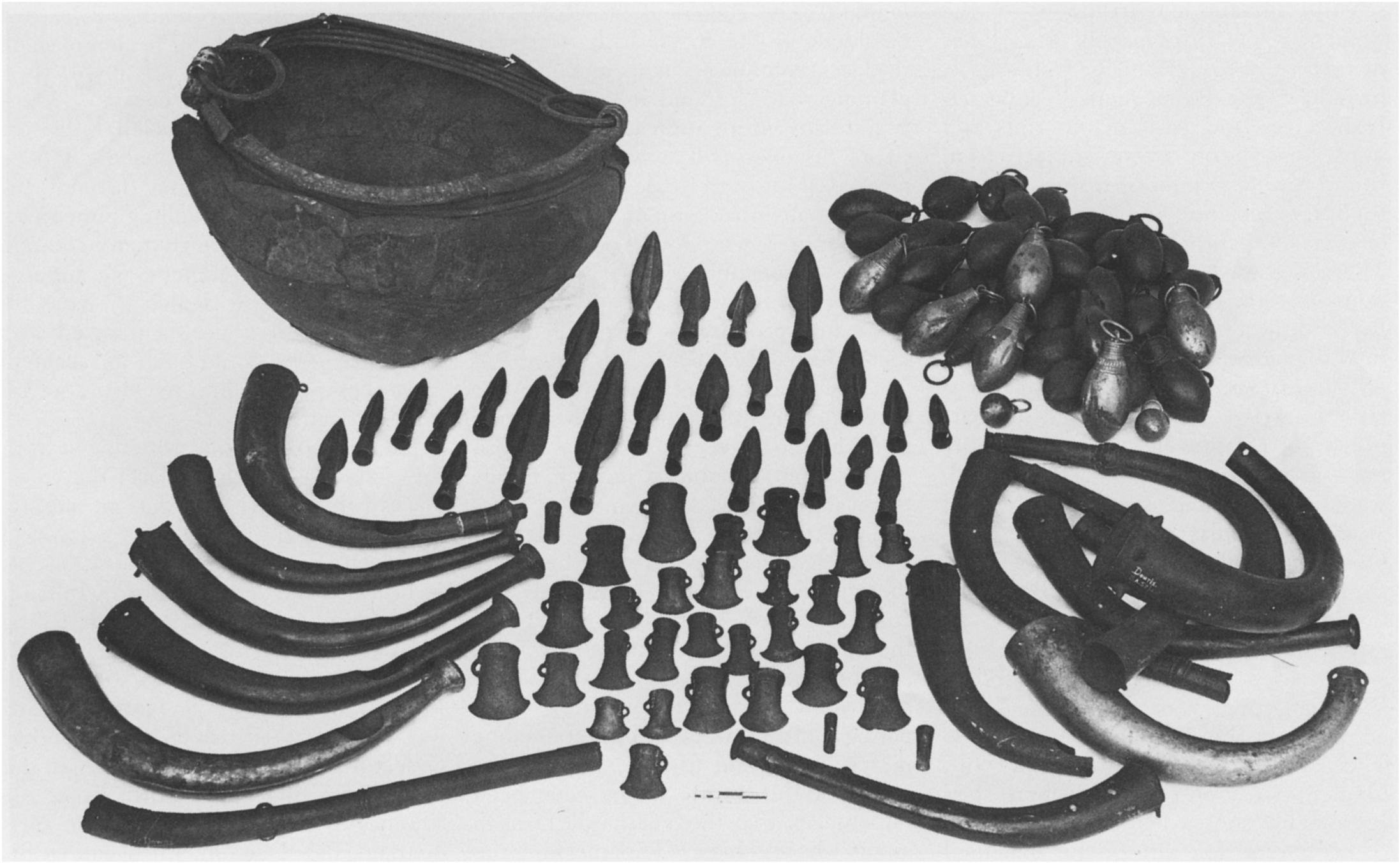
- Image of the hoard in the National Museum of Ireland
- Material: Bronze
- Created: 900–600 BC
- Present location: British Museum, London; National Museum of Ireland, Dublin

The Dowris Hoard is the name of an important Bronze Age hoard of over 200 objects found in Dowris, County Offaly, Ireland. Items from the deposit are currently split between two institutions: the National Museum of Ireland in Dublin and the British Museum in London.

The hoard, mostly of objects in bronze, was probably a ritual deposit, perhaps for religious purposes, though the records of the discovery, by farm labourers in the 1820s, do not allow it to be sure if it was one deposit, or a series. Current thinking tends to see it as a series, possibly over a very long period, of ritual deposits into a lake.

The importance of the hoard in Irish prehistory has led to the naming of the final phase of the Irish Late Bronze Age (900–600 BC) as the Dowris Phase or period. Over time, Irish prehistoric bronzesmiths had become highly adept at casting and working with sheet metal, and the Dowris Phase reflects the culmination of this as well as an industrial growth in metalworking. During this period, ironworking was already found on the European Continent, in Hallstatt culture "C", and had arrived in Britain, but did not reach Ireland. Until the culture was apparently disrupted around 600 BC, gold jewellery of superb quality was produced, as well as weapons, tools, trumpets and other kinds of objects in bronze, of which the Dowris Hoard has an exceptional selection.

== Discovery ==
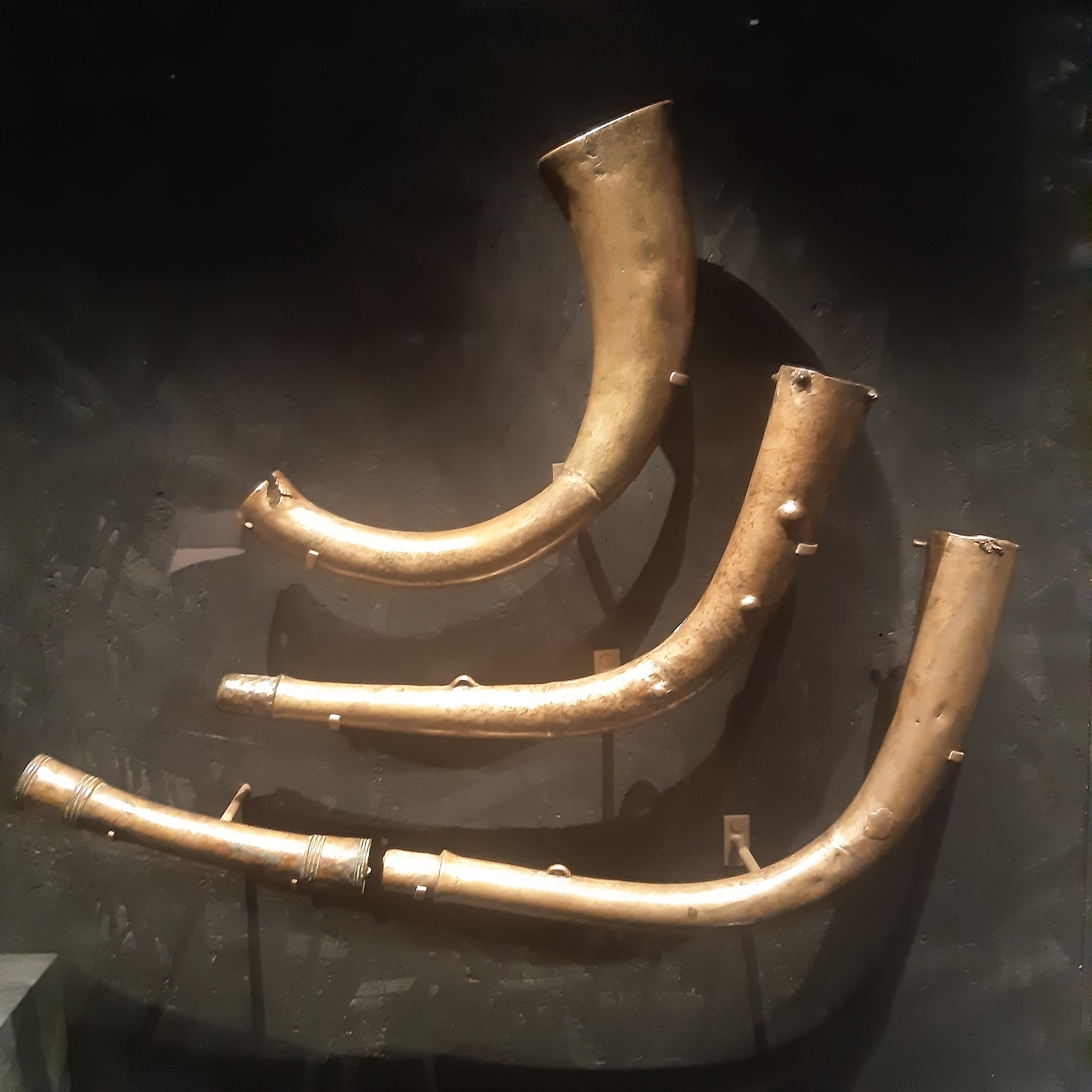
Three trumpets from the hoard in the British Museum

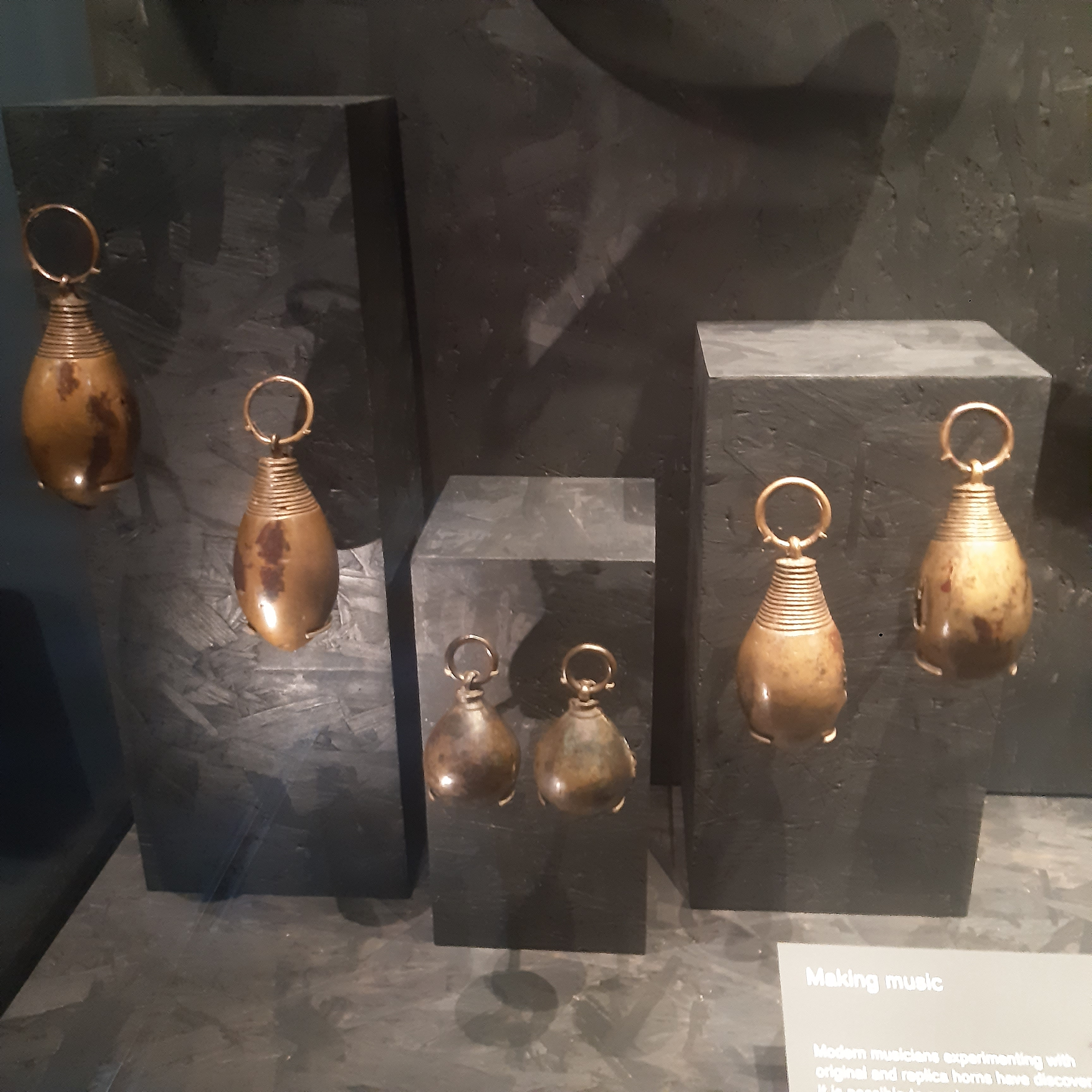
Six crotal bells from the hoard in the British Museum

The Dowris Hoard was accidentally discovered in the 1820s by two men digging trenches for potatoes on a peat bog near the shores of Lough Coura. During the Bronze Age, the area was covered by a shallow lake, which later silted up in the late Middle Ages. Dowris (also known as Doorosheath or Duros) is located near the village of Whigsborough, northeast of Birr in County Offaly, Ireland. The hoard subsequently came into the possession of William Parsons, 3rd Earl of Rosse and TD Cooke. The latter sold his collection of Irish antiquities to the British Museum in 1854.

== Description ==
One of the largest Bronze Age assemblage of artefacts ever found in Ireland, the Dowris Hoard originally comprised more than 200 pieces, of which 111 are currently in the collections of the National Museum of Ireland and 79 in the British Museum. In total, the hoard includes:

- 44 spearheads
- 48 crotals, in two sizes
- 43 socketed axes
- 26 bronze horns or trumpets
- 5 swords (approx 48 cm long, possibly originating from the south of England)
- A riveted bronze cauldron
- Three buckets or situlae
- Numerous tools including chisels and knives.

== See also ==
- Mooghaun North Hoard
- Broighter Treasure
