= Wootton Bassett Road railway station =

Former railway station in England

Wootton Bassett Road

General information
- Location: Wootton Bassett, Wiltshire; England
- Coordinates: 51.5346°N 1.9015°W
- Line: Great Western Main Line

Other information
- Status: Disused

History
- Original company: Great Western Railway

Key dates
- 17 December 1840: opened
- 30 June 1841: closed
Location

Wootton Bassett Road railway station (also known as Hay Lane) was opened on 17 December 1840 as the temporary terminus of the Great Western Railway (GWR) when it was extended from Faringdon Road. It was located about 4 miles (6.4 km) by road east of Wootton Bassett in Wiltshire, England.

Basic locomotive facilities were provided here, and stagecoaches carried passengers to Bath, where they could join another GWR train for the remainder of the journey to Bristol. The GWR was opened from here to Chippenham on 31 May 1841, but the temporary station remained in use here until 30 June 1841 and the locomotive facilities until sometime the following year. It was superseded by the permanent Wootton Bassett station on 30 July 1841, about 2.5 miles (4.0 km) west.

Preceding station	Historical railways	Following station
Swindon	Great Western Main Line	Chippenham
