= Wootton Bassett Mud Spring =

Protected area in Wiltshire, England

Coordinates: 51°31′58″N 1°53′22″W

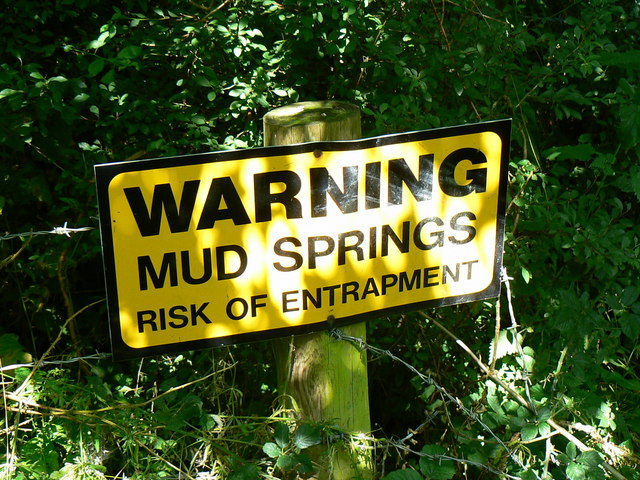
Sign warning of the risk of entrapment in the Mud Springs

Wootton Bassett Mud Spring (grid reference SU078815) is an 8,000-square-metre (9,600 sq yd) geological Site of Special Scientific Interest in Wiltshire, England, notified in 1997. It can be found following a ten-minute walk from the canal car park opposite Templars Way, along the Wilts & Berks Canal cut and then south across agricultural land.

The mud springs at Royal Wootton Bassett are oozing springs of cold, grey mud that blister up under a thin layer of vegetation from Ampthill Clay. The water emerging in the mud comes from an aquifer in the Coral Rag Formation beneath the clay and brings to the surface iridescent fossils originating in the mid to late Oxfordian age of the Late Jurassic. The fossils, sometimes with aragonite covering, include foraminifera and ostracoda and are exceptionally well preserved. Also found are many specimens of otoliths, dominated by forms identified as Otolithus (Leptolepididarum). Ammonites (particularly Ringsteadia and Amoeboceras), belemnites, mollusc, crustacean and fish fossils have also been found at the site.

The flow is generally a slow ooze; however, in 1974 workers clearing the nearby stream, Hancock's Water, described a jet of mud rising into the air. In 1990 an attempt was made to fill in the most active spring by putting 100 tonnes (110 tons) of rubble into it. This displaced mud, which ran into Hancock's Water, but the rubble could no longer be seen.

In June 1996, the British Microbiological Biodiversity Association (BMBA) sent a team of microbiologists to monitor and sample the springs. They discovered that the springs are more than 120 metres (390 ft) deep and 75 millimetres (3.0 in) in diameter. They emit a steady flow of fluidised mud at a rate of several cubic metres per day. The BMBA scientists were interested in the anaerobic microbiology of the mud flow and the possible links between this source and the deep terrestrial biosphere. They discovered that within the area there are five main sites of mud-spring activity, one of which can be subdivided into three separate mud springs. They also measured the temperature, pH and conductivity of the fluid within the springs.
