= Royal Wootton Bassett =

Market town in Wiltshire, England

Coordinates: 51.541°N 1.905°W

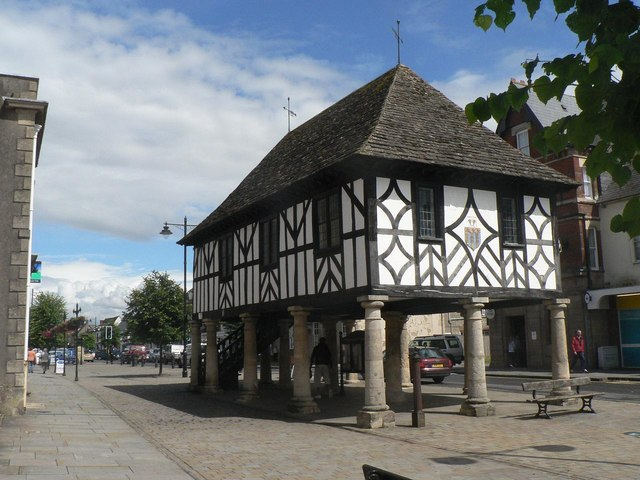
- Royal Wootton Bassett's former Town Hall, now a museum, 2007

- Location within Wiltshire
- Population: 13,570 (2021 census)
- OS grid reference: SU067825
- Civil parish: Royal Wootton Bassett
- Unitary authority: Wiltshire
- Ceremonial county: Wiltshire
- Region: South West
- Country: England
- Sovereign state: United Kingdom
- Post town: Swindon
- Postcode district: SN4
- Dialling code: 01793
- Police: Wiltshire
- Fire: Dorset and Wiltshire
- Ambulance: South Western
- UK Parliament: Chippenham
- Website: www.royalwoottonbassett.gov.uk

Royal Wootton Bassett (/ˈrɔɪəl ˈwʊtən ˈbæsɪt/), formerly Wootton Bassett, is a market town and civil parish in Wiltshire, England. In the north of the county, it lies 5 miles (8 km) southwest of central Swindon and 8 miles (13 km) northeast of Calne. The parish had a population of 13,570 at the 2021 census

The town was granted royal patronage in March 2011 by Elizabeth II in recognition of its role in the early-21st-century military funeral repatriations from Afghanistan and Iraq, which passed through the town. The honour was officially conferred in a ceremony on 16 October 2011 and was the first royal patronage to be conferred upon a town – as distinct from a borough or county – since 1909.

== History ==
=== Iron Age ===
In June and July of 2014, an excavation carried out by AC archaeology at the Royal Wootton Bassett Sports Hub found the remains of a roundhouse. The roundhouse would have been 9m in diameter and is most likely to be from the Iron Age. To the west of the roundhouse, a field boundary was exposed with mid to late Iron Age pottery found in the fill. It has also been suggested that Brynards Hill was an Iron Age farming settlement and was not a hillfort.

=== Roman ===
Evidence suggests that settlement continued from the Iron Age where the Royal Wootton Bassett sports hub now stands. A small number of late 1st century finds were excavated in the 2014 AC archaeology excavation. In the northeast corner of the site, evidence for Romano-British settlement was uncovered in the form of post holes representing two possible structures; iron slag and Romano-British pottery were found in the post holes. There were two wells at the site, encountered in the 2014 excavation, one containing the bones of a horse and a dog. Also found was the burial of an infant, who may or may not have been born before they died. Two Roman coins were dug up at the site along with 2,696 shards of Roman pottery.

=== Wodeton settlement ===
The name Wootton is derived from the Old English wudutūn meaning 'wood settlement', referring to Braydon Forest. Sometime prior to the year 1212, the town's manor was held by Alan Basset whose surname was added to the town's name.

AD 681 is usually taken as the starting point for recorded history of Wootton Bassett, then known as Wodeton, it being referred to in that year in a Malmesbury Abbey charter granting land to the Abbot.

Archaeological discoveries in the area tend to confirm the tradition that the original Wodeton was near the present Dunnington Road. Wodeton was sacked by the marauding Danes in 1015, whereupon the survivors decided to move uphill to the site of the present High Street.

=== Domesday Book ===
Wootton Bassett is mentioned in the Domesday Book of 1086, where it is noted that Miles Crispin held the rights and these included "land for 12 ploughs...a mill...and 24 acres (9.7 ha) of meadow...33 acres of pasture and woodland which is two leagues by a league". It was said to be worth nine pounds.

=== Royal status ===
In the early 21st century, the town paid informal tributes during military repatriation funeral processions which passed through the town, eventually attracting significant media coverage. On 16 March 2011, Prime Minister David Cameron announced, at the start of Prime Minister's Questions, that while "from September, military repatriations will no longer pass through the town of Wootton Bassett", "Her Majesty has agreed to confer the title 'Royal' upon the town, as an enduring symbol of the nation's admiration and gratitude". The addition to the town's name was enacted through letters patent and became effective on 16 October 2011, when The Princess Royal visited the town to present formally the letters patent to the town council. Royal Wootton Bassett is the fourth royal town in the country after Royal Sutton Coldfield, Royal Leamington Spa and Royal Tunbridge Wells, and the first to receive the status in over 100 years.

== Religious sites ==
=== Parish church ===
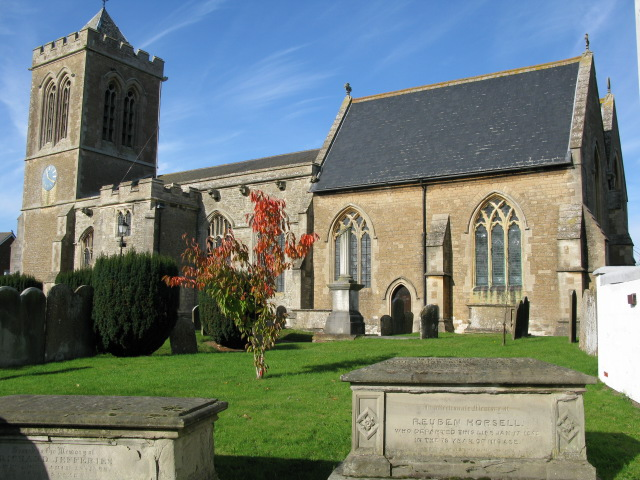
St Bartholomew and All Saints church

The Church of England parish church of St Bartholomew and All Saints is on the north side of High Street. A 13th-century church was rebuilt in the 15th century, and extensively restored in 1869–1870 by G. E. Street at the expense of Sir Henry Meux. The church was designated as grade II* listed in 1955.

The church has a chancel and south-east chapel, a wide nave and a south-west tower. Street rebuilt the whole east end, moving the east window to the south wall; he also added the north aisle and vestry, and rebuilt the tower while increasing its height. Julian Orbach considers the best surviving 15th-century work to be the south facade, which has gargoyles, three tall windows and a two-storey porch. The south chancel aisle was made into a lady chapel in 1944.

The low-pitched roofs over the nave are 15th-century, as is the oak pulpit. Street designed the circular stone font, the chancel fittings and the pews; the stone reredos was carved by Thomas Earp. Stained glass in the east and south-east windows is by Hardman, 1871; the west window is an 1890 memorial to Sir Henry Meux. There is a ring of eight bells: three by Roger Purdue dated 1633, the others by John Warner & Sons from 1899.

The church retains its own parish, not grouped with any others. Between 1951 and 1974 the vicar of Wootton Bassett was also responsible for Christ Church at Broad Town.

=== Others ===
A Congregational church was built in Wood Street in 1825 and continues in use as a United Reformed Church.

Primitive Methodists built a church in 1838 at the western end of High Street, near Rope Yard. It continues in use, the congregation having been joined by the town's Wesleyan Methodists in 1965.

The Catholic Church of the Sacred Heart was built on the north side of High Street in 1993.

== Geography ==
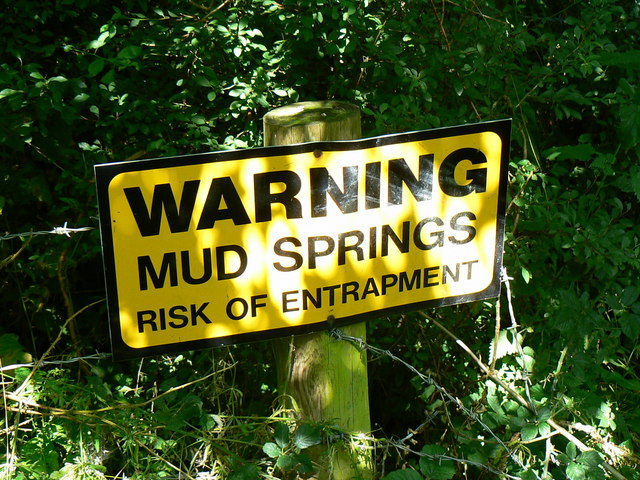
Sign warning of the risk of entrapment in the Mud Springs

Suburbs of Royal Wootton Bassett include Noremarsh, Coped Hall, Woodshaw and Vastern (a small hamlet to the south). Bishop Fowley is shown on Andrews' and Dury's Map of Wiltshire, 1810 as being an outlying hamlet southwest of the town; the location is now known as Vowley Farm.

Wootton Bassett Mud Spring is a 8,000 m^{2} (86,000 sq ft) geological Site of Special Scientific Interest, which was notified in 1997, and is known for its large amount of Jurassic fossils.

== Governance ==
The first tier of local government is Royal Wootton Bassett Town Council, which has 16 members, elected by voters in three wards. Councillors elect one of their number to serve as mayor for a period of one year.

The town falls under the auspices of Wiltshire Council, a unitary authority established in 2009 as part of wider local government changes. Three electoral divisions – Royal Wootton Bassett North, East, and South & West – each elect one member of the council. The East division covers the east side of the town and the rural areas to the east and north, including Hook and Lydiard Millicent.

For elections to Parliament, the parish is part of the Chippenham constituency, represented since 2024 by Sarah Gibson for the Liberal Democrats. From 1447 until 1832, Wootton Bassett constituency was a parliamentary borough which elected two MPs. In 1832 it was deemed a rotten borough and abolished by the Great Reform Act.

The town is twinned with Blain in western France.

== Population ==
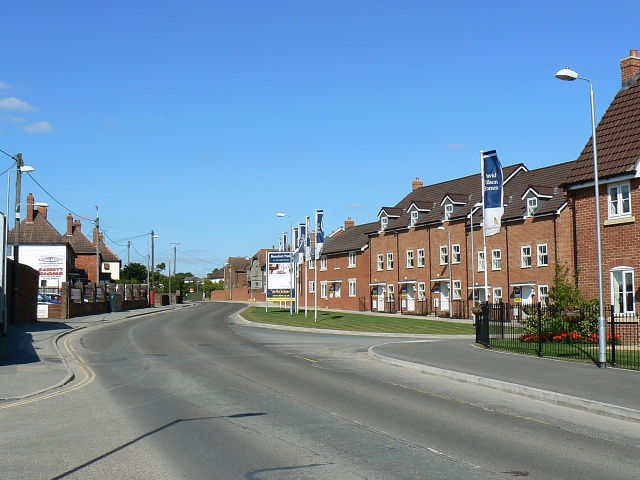
Housing on the large site of the former St Ivel factory

The 2001 United Kingdom census recorded the parish's population as 11,043, indicating that the town tripled in population total during the previous 50 years. At the 2021 census, the parish population was 13,571. The Office for National Statistics also define a Royal Wootton Bassett "built-up area" which excludes outlying parts of the parish such as Vastern, but includes a small part of Lydiard Tregoze parish north of the boundary on Swindon Road and Malmesbury Road; this area had a population of 13,005 in 2021.

Since the opening of the M4 motorway in the 1970s, the town has become attractive to commuters, many travelling to the towns and cities of Swindon, Chippenham, Bath and Bristol. The town also has a significant Royal Air Force population due to its proximity to MoD Lyneham, which is now largely a training establishment but until 2012 was the site of RAF Lyneham.

Census population of Royal Wootton Bassett parish
Census	Population	Female	Male	Households	Source
2001	11,043	5,620	5,423	4,617	
2011	11,385	5,795	5,590	4,905	
2021	13,571	6,921	6,650	5,849	

== Education ==
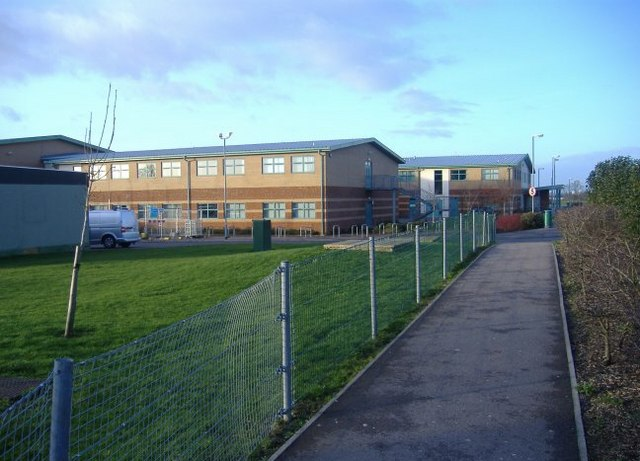
Royal Wootton Bassett Academy

Royal Wootton Bassett has a secondary school, Royal Wootton Bassett Academy, on the north-west edge of the town. There are four primary schools: St Bartholomew's Primary Academy (formerly C of E Primary School), Longleaze Primary School, Noremarsh Junior School and Wootton Bassett Infants' School.

The town is also home to detachments of the Army Cadet Force and the Sea Cadets.

== Economy ==
The town has always been a market town, and hence with many trades associated with farming and agriculture.

In 1908 Wiltshire United Dairies built a dairy and creamery in the town. Merged in 1916 to form United Dairies, in 1931 a private siding was opened from Wootton Bassett Junction railway station to allow milk trains to service the plant. Merged into Unigate in 1958, the plant became a key production site for the St Ivel Shape brand yoghurts, before being sold to Danone for £32 million. The factory consequently closed in February 2003. The site was sold for £19 million in August 2004, and the factory demolished in June 2005. It was redeveloped as the Beaufort Park housing estate.

== Repatriations ==
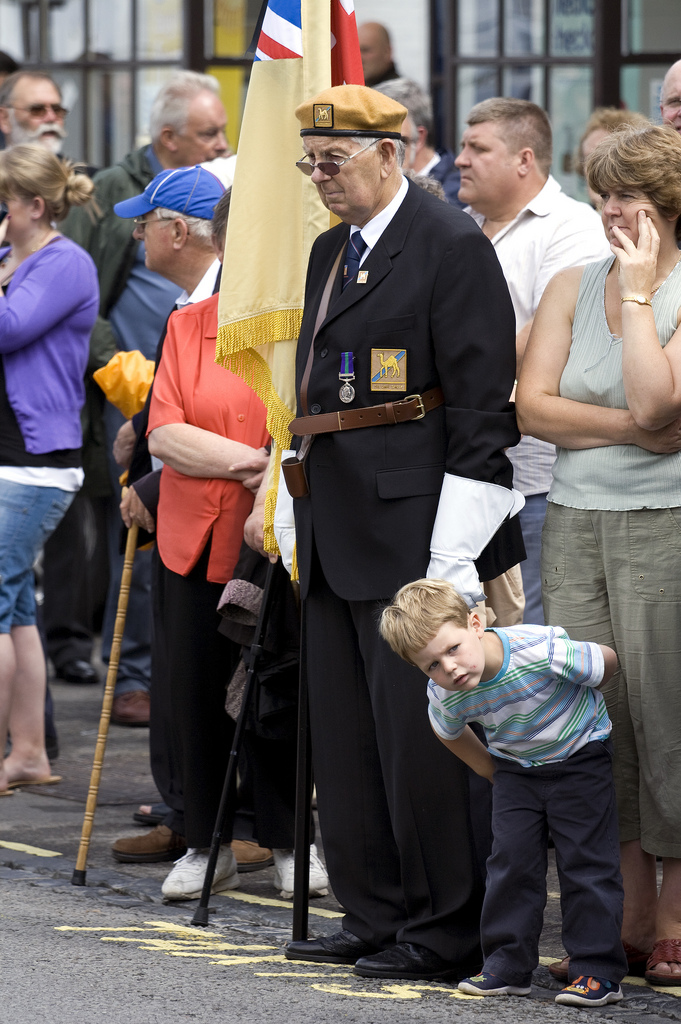
Typical group of mourners with a veteran acting as flag bearer

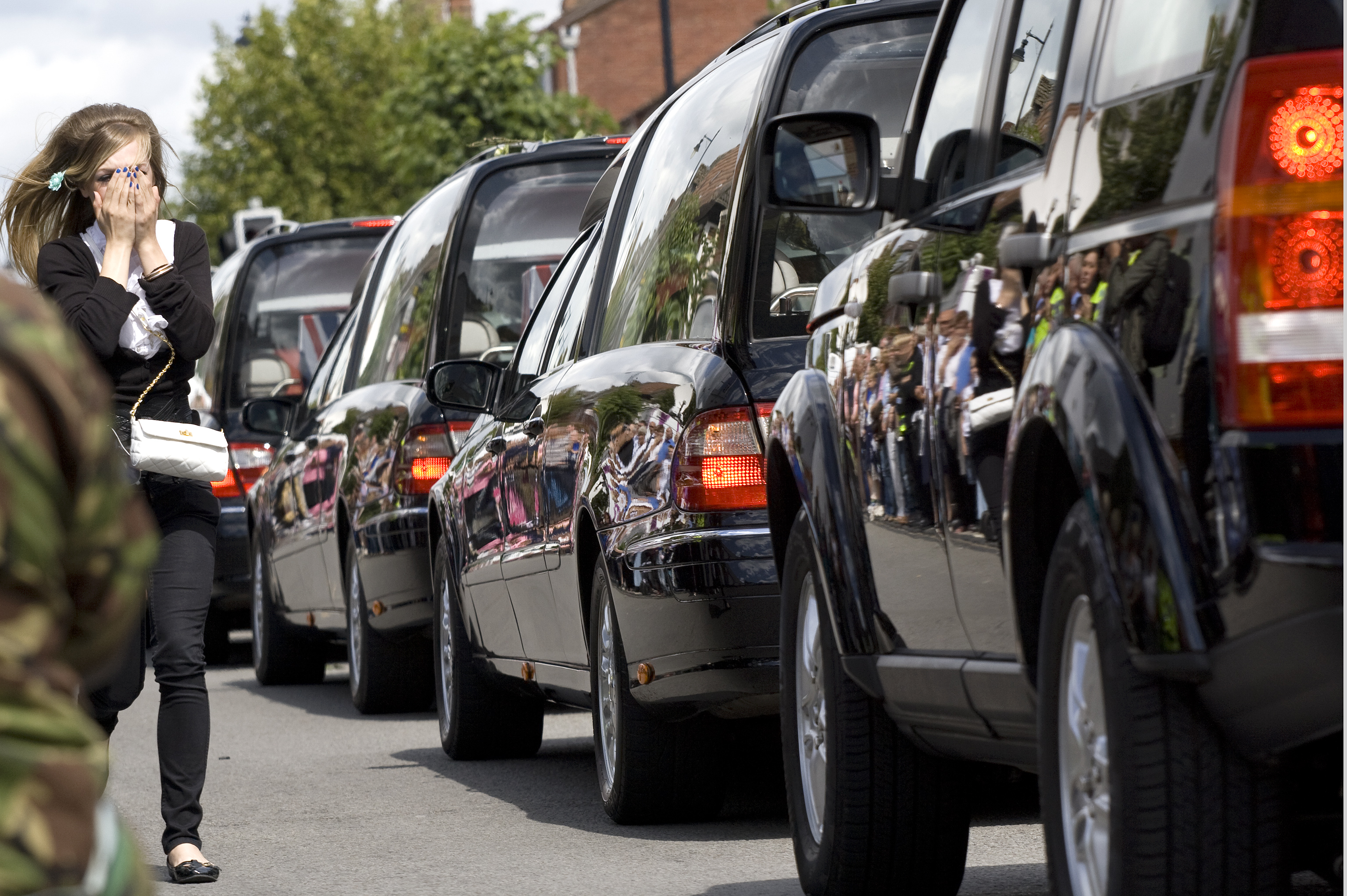
A convoy of hearses carrying the bodies of military personnel through Wootton Bassett in 2009

From April 2007, the bodies of servicemen and women of the British Armed Forces killed in Iraq and Afghanistan were repatriated to RAF Lyneham 4.5 miles (7.2 km) to the south. The bodies would then be transported to John Radcliffe Hospital, Oxford, in coffins covered with a Union Flag, passing through the town on their way. In the summer of 2007, local members of the Royal British Legion became aware of the repatriation, and decided to formally show their respect to the soldiers as they passed through their town. This led to other people assembling along the route, with large gatherings of sometimes over 1,000 people. After runway repairs at RAF Brize Norton had been completed, the RAF continued to use Lyneham, a Ministry of Defence spokesman saying that because the "people of Wootton Bassett had done such a lot to lend their support, it was felt it would be insensitive to transfer the process back to Brize." When RAF Lyneham closed in September 2011, the repatriations moved to RAF Brize Norton and go near to the town of Carterton.

=== Tributes ===
In October 2008, an armed forces parade was held in the town. On Friday 29 January 2010 the town was visited by The Prince of Wales and his wife The Duchess of Cornwall, to lay a wreath at the war memorial and meet local people. On 21 December 2009, Prince William presented the town with one of The Sun's "Millie" awards for support to the armed forces, stating: "one of the most remarkable things is that the people are so modest, they refuse to accept any praise".

In May 2009, the Royal British Legion honoured Wootton Bassett with a special award in recognition of Legion members, many of whom are ex-servicemen and women, who attend the repatriations. Motorcyclists from The Royal British Legion Riders Branch attended repatriations held in the town.

Calls for the town to have royal status bestowed on it had emerged in September 2009 and, while in the form of petitions and social media campaigns there had been public support for both the Royal title and other forms of national expressions of thanks at the time, local figures were less keen on the idea. South Wootton Bassett councillor Chris Wannell and Wootton Bassett Mayor Steve Bucknell both thought that it was not what local people would want, preferring to just honour the dead with no expectation of thanks.

Other tributes have included a public mass charity motorcycle parade through the town in March 2010, which also raised £100,000 for the charity Afghan Heroes. In 2011, the community of Royal Wootton Bassett themselves made a less sombre tribute as they came together over 5 months to re-record the classic Green Day track, "Wake Me Up When September Ends" from their American Idiot album, in aid of military charities. The project was called "Wootton Bassett Rocks", and its aim was to raise £1 million for four charities: The Royal British Legion, Combat Stress, The Undentable Trust, and Soldiers, Sailors, Airmen & Families Association (SSAFA). The single was made available for download and on DVD in November 2011, and entered the rock charts in several countries.

=== Protests ===
In 2009, the far-right English Defence League visited Wootton Bassett, after plans for a demonstration in the town by the Muslim extremist group Islam4UK, led by Anjem Choudary, came under widespread condemnation. The group eventually called off the plan, claiming that the publicity generated had "successfully highlighted the plight of Muslims in Afghanistan" and so "no more could be achieved even if a procession were to take place".

== Arms of Royal Wootton Bassett ==
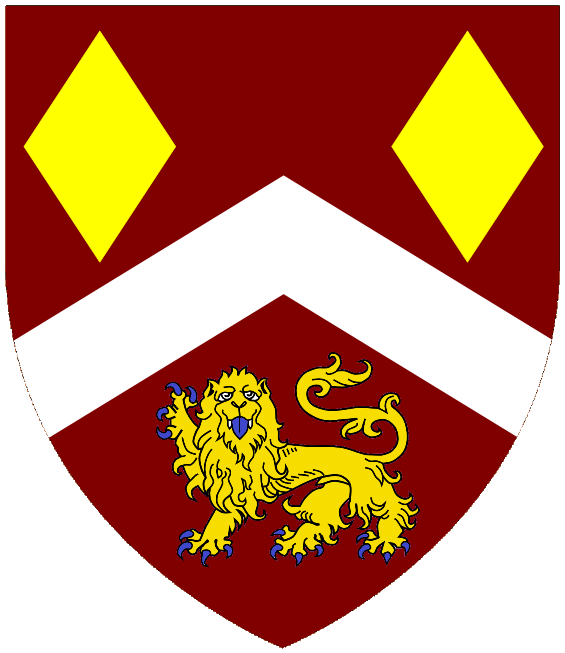
The town arms

An official coat of arms was granted to Wootton Bassett Town Council, by Letters Patent of Garter, Clarenceux and Norroy and Ulster Kings of Arms, on 30 August 2011, the day before the date of the Queen's patent granting the designation "royal" to the town. The town had previously used unofficial arms consisting of a chevron between three lozenges: the granted design adapts this to reflect the royal favour accorded in recognition of the town's role in recent repatriations of fallen servicemen and women, and is: Gules a Chevron Argent between in chief two Lozenges and in base a Lion passant guardant Or. The lion passant guardant is a visible heraldic sign of the royal favour.

== Transport ==
=== Road ===
The main road through the town is the A3102, which connects it to Swindon to the east and Melksham to the south-west, a town in the west of the county. The only other numbered road out of the town is the B4042, which runs to Malmesbury in the west. The town is also close to Junction 16 of the M4 motorway connecting London with South Wales, allowing easy access to other towns and cities of the M4 corridor.

=== Rail ===
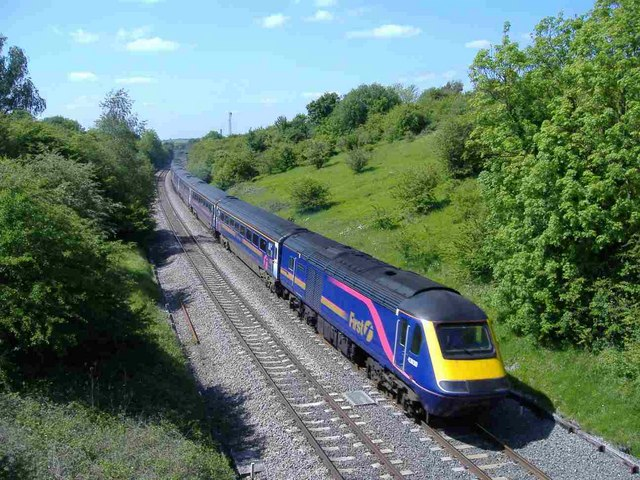
A First Great Western express train from South Wales approaches Wootton Bassett junction in 2007

Royal Wootton Bassett has no railway station, although it has been served in the past by Wootton Bassett Road and Wootton Bassett Junction stations, and is a major junction on the rail network, being the location where the South Wales Main Line branches off of the Great Western Main Line. Thus stations nearby offer direct connections to London, the South West and South Wales.

The first station to serve the town was Wootton Bassett Road, opened by the Great Western Railway (GWR) in 1840 some distance from the town (and sometimes referred to as Hay Lane), when the Great Western Main Line from London Paddington reached the town. After just a year, with the completion of the Box Tunnel allowing the line to reach Bristol Temple Meads, this was replaced by the closer Wootton Bassett railway station. In 1903, after the South Wales line opened, the station was demolished and rebuilt as Wootton Bassett Junction at the junction of the two lines. British Railways closed that station in 1965. There have been ongoing attempts to re-open a station in the early 21st century. Commuters wishing to use train services would have to travel to Swindon or Chippenham for regular services to London and the West Country; a bus service runs from Chippenham to Swindon via the town to allow these journeys to be made via public transport.

=== Buses ===
There are two primary bus operators in the town: Stagecoach West and Coachstyle. Stagecoach operates the 55 service to Swindon, and Chippenham via Lyneham and Calne whilst Coachstyle operates the 99 service to Swindon, and Chippenham via Malmesbury, Brinkworth and Hullavington. As well as this, Swindon's Bus Company runs the C53 to Cirencester College twice a day during the college's term dates. Wiltshire Connect also operates additional on-demand services to the surrounding villages.

=== Canal ===
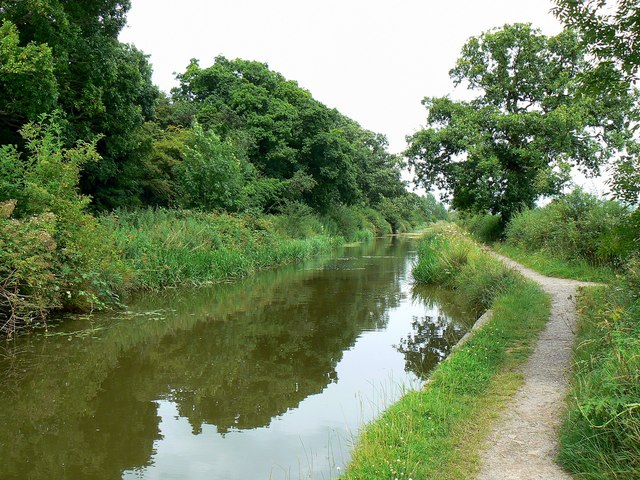
The Wilts & Berks Canal near the southern edge of the town

The route of the former Wilts & Berks Canal passes through Royal Wootton Bassett parish, south of the town. The canal reached here from Semington in 1801 and was completed when it reached Abingdon in 1810. The last narrowboat traffic to Wootton Bassett was in 1906 and the canal was abandoned by act of parliament in 1914. The canal is now being restored by the Wilts & Berks Canal Trust.

== Culture ==
The town has an annual arts festival which involves music, speech, drama, musical theatre, and dance.

=== Sport ===
In football, the town is represented by Wootton Bassett Town F.C. who play their home games at the 2,000-capacity Gerard Buxton Sports Ground. Other sports clubs include Wootton Bassett Hockey Club, Wootton Bassett Otters Swimming Club, Royal Wootton Bassett Rugby Football Club and Wootton Bassett Bowls Club.

In summer 2015, the Gerard Buxton Sports Ground relocated from Rylands Way to the north side of the Brinkworth Road, just outside the town but walkable and cyclable from most parts. The site is held by trustees and is known overall as Royal Wootton Bassett Sports Association. It is run almost exclusively by volunteers from the participating sports clubs. Initially these were RWB Cricket Club, Hounds (running), the tennis club and the football club; they were joined in 2017 by the North Thames Boules Club (now the Royal Wootton Bassett Petanque Club). The main building hosts changing facilities, a bar and tuck shop, kitchen area, meeting and function rooms.

=== Media ===
Local news and television programmes are provided by BBC West and ITV West Country. Television signals are received from the Mendip TV transmitter.

The town's local radio stations are BBC Radio Wiltshire on 103.5 FM, Heart West on 97.2 FM, Greatest Hits Radio South West (formerly Sam FM) on 107.7 and Swindon 105.5, a community based radio station which broadcast from its studios in Swindon on 105.5 FM.

The Gazette and Herald is the local newspaper that serves the town.

=== Museums ===
The Wootton Bassett Museum is the former town hall, which is an upper storey supported on 15 pillars. It was built at the end of the 17th century, a gift from the Hyde family (Earls of Clarendon).

=== War memorial ===
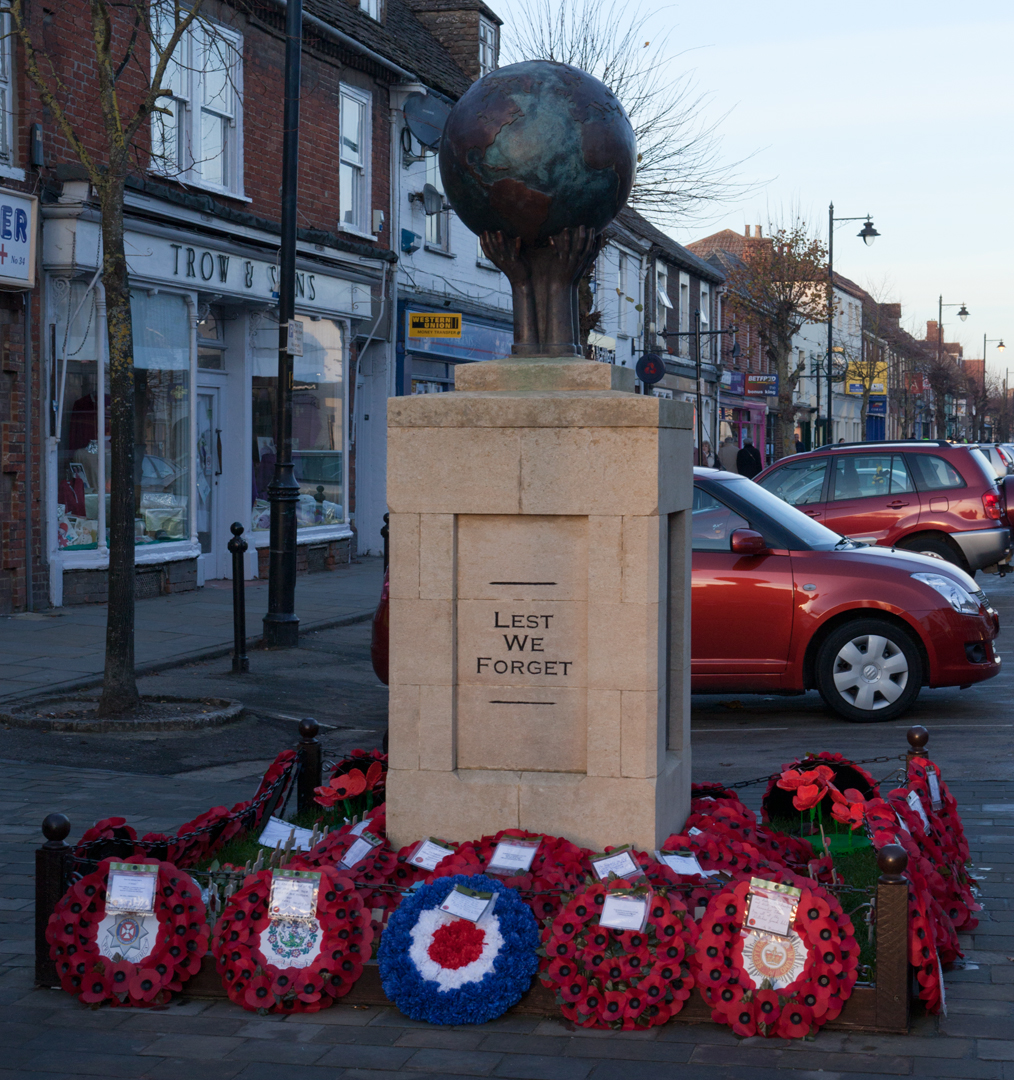
War Memorial

The town previously had war memorials in the form of a memorial garden in the cemetery and the memorial hall on Tinker's Field. In October 2004 a new memorial was unveiled in the town, a simple pedestal topped by a bronze of hands holding up a globe. The opening was the culmination of a five-year publicity and fund raising campaign, initiated by local resident Jay Cunningham who felt that the garden and hall were not prominent enough. The design of the memorial was by Lance Corporal Alan Wilson of the Wootton Bassett Army Cadet Force, chosen by public vote, and then sculpted by local artist Vivien ap Rhys Price.

== Freedom of the Town ==
Johnathan Dudley Bourne, former town clerk, received the Freedom of the Town of Royal Wootton Bassett on 29 July 2021.
