= Crotal bell =

Type of small bell or rattle

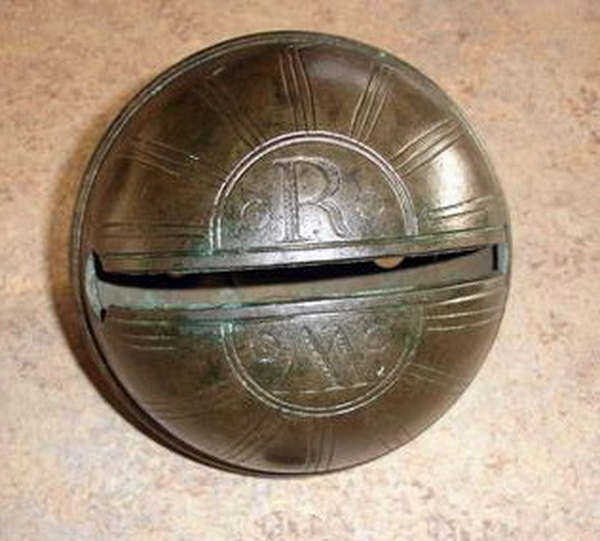
Crotal bell cast by the Robert Wells bell foundry of Aldbourne, Wiltshire

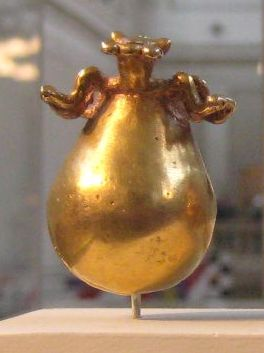
Crotal bell from Panama, gold, 6th–10th century

Crotal bells (Greek 'crotalon' – castanet or rattle) are various types of small bells or rattles. They were produced in various pre-Columbian cultures of the Americas. In Europe they were probably made from before the early Middle Ages; though many founders cast bells of this type, the Robert Wells bell foundry of Aldbourne, Wiltshire, produced the largest range. The first medieval designs came in two separate halves into which a metal pea was introduced and the two halves were then soldered or crimped together. Somewhere around 1400 they were cast in a single piece with a ball of metal inside.

Crotal bells, also known as rumble bells, were used on horse-drawn vehicles before motor vehicles were common. They were often made of bronze with a slot cut down the side. These bells were used to warn other users of horse-drawn vehicles (mostly on country roads) that another vehicle was approaching. On smaller vehicles, they were hung on a small leather-and-iron harness bracket above the horse's collar; on larger vehicles, such as delivery wagons, they were driven into the wooden frame of the wagon.

== Bronze Age crotals ==
A different form of crotal is found in Prehistoric Ireland. The National Museum of Ireland and the British Museum have several examples on display dating from the late Bronze Age which were found in the Dowris Hoard, alongside various brass wind instruments. These are bronze cylinders in the rough shape of a teardrop, with a piece of baked clay or a pebble inside. It is presumed that they functioned as a type of rattle. The hoard had 48 of them in total, in two sizes. Only two other examples are known, both Irish.

== See also ==
- Crotales, a type of cymbal set
