= Wootton Bassett Junction railway station =

Former railway station in England

Wootton Bassett Junction
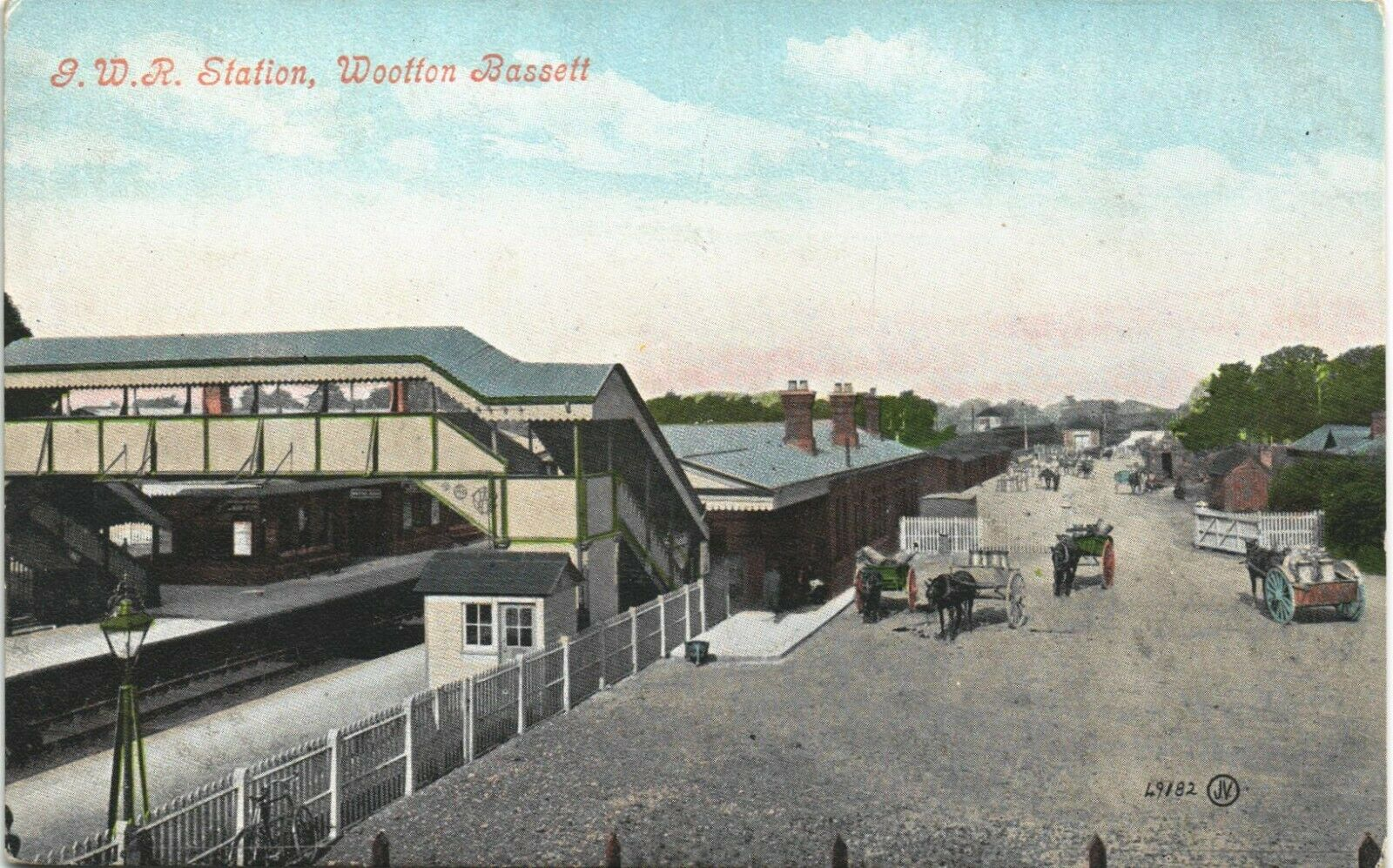
- Wootton Bassett railway station before World War I

General information
- Location: Wootton Bassett, County of Wiltshire; England
- Coordinates: 51.5346°N 1.9015°W
- Lines: Great Western Main Line; South Wales Main Line
- Platforms: 2

Other information
- Status: Disused

History
- Original company: Great Western Railway

Key dates
- 30 July 1841: opened
- 1 July 1903: renamed Wootton Bassett Junction
- 4 January 1965: closed to passenger traffic
- 4 October 1965: closed
Location

Wootton Bassett Junction railway station, formerly Wootton Bassett railway station, was a junction station in Wootton Bassett where the Great Western and South Wales Main Lines diverge. Opened in 1841, it closed in 1965.

== History ==
Wootton Bassett railway station opened on 30 July 1841, when the Great Western Main Line from London Paddington was extended from Chippenham via the Box Tunnel through to Bristol Temple Meads. It replaced Wootton Bassett Road, about 2.5 miles (4.0 km) to the east as the station serving Wootton Bassett.

The railway was double track, with a platform on each side of the line, each with a small stone building. The main offices were on the north side of the line but a goods shed was provided on the south side at the London end of the platform. In 1850, an excursion train collided with a horsebox that had escaped from a siding at the station. Following this accident, the Great Western Railway provided trap points and scotch blocks at all sidings that exited onto running lines.

In 1873 a signal box was opened at the west end of the Bristol-bound platform to control trains through the station; until then signals had been worked independently, and they were now all able to be interlocked to prevent conflicting moves. A footbridge was provided from 1880 to allow passengers to cross the tracks, but a road bridge was also available at the east end of the station. June 1874 saw a third rail laid along each track to give a mixed gauge which allowed 1,435 mm (4 ft 8 1/2 in) standard gauge trains to operate through the station, although broad gauge services to Cornwall continued to operate until May 1892.

In 1896 an Act of Parliament was passed to allow the GWR to construct a new Bristol and South Wales Direct Railway, which would shorten the distance from London to South Wales by about 10 miles (16 km). It was to commence from a junction a little west of Wootton Bassett station and run to Patchway north of Bristol, from where trains could continue through the Severn Tunnel.

The station was rebuilt on the same site, and opened on 1 July 1903 under the new name Wootton Basset Junction. This coincided with the opening of the new line which completed the present-day South Wales Main Line. New platforms with brick-built buildings were provided. The main offices and goods yard were in almost the same places as before. There were now two signal boxes, Wootton Bassett West and Wootton Bassett East, which were brought into use in November 1901 and July 1903 respectively.

By the 1930s, Wootton Bassett had become a railhead for goods traffic to the surrounding district, with the GWR basing a country lorry service here, and a new warehouse was provided to support this. In 1931 a private siding was opened to allow milk trains to service the creamery operated by United Dairies.

The Great Western Railway was nationalised to become the Western Region of British Railways on 1 January 1948. General goods service was withdrawn on 19 May 1964, followed on 4 January 1965 by local passenger services between Swindon and Chippenham. Coal trains continued to serve the goods yard until 4 October 1965.

== Accidents and incidents ==
On 7 September 1841, a train derailed in a landslip near the station.

On 7 March 2015, a West Coast Railways charter train failed to stop at a signal on the approach to Wootton Bassett Junction, eventually coming to a halt foul of the junction. The train that the signal was protecting had already passed through the junction.

== Today ==
The station buildings have been demolished but the main approach road on the north side of the line is still clearly visible. A loop line allows up trains (those towards London) from the South Wales Direct line to be moved aside while faster trains overtake them; there is no connection to this loop from the Bristol line.

The approach road on the south side gives access to a Foster Yeoman stone distribution depot. The limestone arrives by train from the Mendip Hills and a siding serves the depot, alongside a single-ended siding that lies alongside the main line. The connection for these sidings only link with the line to Chippenham, so the stone trains first pass through the station and continue to Swindon, where the locomotive runs around to the back of the train and brings it back to Wootton Bassett where it propels it into the siding to discharge its load.

Both routes are signalled to allow bi-directional running on each line, although trains keep to left-hand running under normal circumstances. A pair of crossovers between the Bristol lines at Wootton Bassett allows trains to be changed between the left and right hand lines if required.

Preceding station	Historical railways	Following station
Swindon; Line and station open	Great Western Railway; Great Western Main Line	Dauntsey; Line open, station closed
Swindon; Line and station open	Great Western Railway; South Wales Main Line	Brinkworth; Line open, station closed

== Proposed reopening ==
In 2011, Wiltshire Council and Wessex Chamber of Commerce jointly commissioned Network Rail to evaluate construction of a new station at Wootton Bassett to serve the Interface Business Park. The station was proposed to be built on the site of the previous station and served by First Great Western services from Swindon to Salisbury.
