= Moray Council elections =

Local government elections in Moray, Scotland

Moray Council in Scotland holds elections every five years, previously holding them every four years from its creation as a single-tier authority in 1995 to 2007.

== Election results ==
=== Moray district council ===
Year	Conservative	SNP	Labour	Independent
1974	0	1	0	17
1977	0	3	0	15
1980	0	3	0	15
1984 (Note: New ward boundaries.)	0	2	1	15
1988	0	7	2	9
1992	1	7	1	9

=== Moray Council ===
Year	Conservative	SNP	Labour	Liberal Democrats	Green	Independent
1995	0	13	3	0	0	2
1999 (Note: New ward boundaries.)	1	2	6	2	0	15
2003	1	3	5	1	0	16
2007 (Note: Change to single transferable vote system and new ward boundaries.)	3	9	2	0	0	12
2012	3	10	3	0	0	10
2017 (Note: New ward boundaries.)	8	9	1	0	0	8
2022	11	8	3	1	1	2

== Results maps ==
1984 results map

1988 results map

1992 results map

1995 results map

1999 results map

2003 results map

2012 results map

2017 results map

== By-elections ==
=== 2003-2007 ===
Party	Candidate	Votes	%
Independent	Joseph Mackay	552	63.6
SNP	Gordon McDonald	196	22.6
Conservative	Ian Moir	89	10.3
Liberal Democrats	Gordon Holms	31	3.6
Majority		356	41.0
Independent hold			

Party	Candidate	Votes	%
SNP	-	286	30.8
Independent	-	244	26.3
Independent	-	187	20.1
Conservative	-	121	13.0
Independent	-	91	9.8
Majority		42	4.5
SNP gain from Independent			

Party	Candidate	Votes	%
Independent	Andrina Taylor	383	37.6
Conservative	-	242	23.8
Independent	-	232	22.8
Independent	-	99	9.7
Liberal Democrats	-	62	6.1
Majority		141	13.8
Independent gain from SNP			

=== 2007-2012 ===
Elgin City South by-election (14 February 2008) - 1 seat
Party	Candidate	FPv%	Count								
Party	Candidate	FPv%	1	2	3	4	5	6	7	8	9
SNP	John Alexander Sharp	32.10	670	670	672	672	679	685	706	763	884
Independent	Hamish Simpson	24.3	513	513	518	523	527	540	612	722	845
Labour	Mark Cascarino	17.0	358	358	361	363	370	380	403	459	
Independent	James Scott Allan	10.6	223	224	227	229	233	240	278		
Conservative	Frank Brown	9.8	206	206	206	208	216	223			
Liberal Democrats	Peter J Horton	2.3	48	48	49	50	53				
Scottish Senior Citizens	Andy Anderson	1.5	32	32	32	37					
UKIP	Matthew Coughlan Desmond	1.0	20	20	20						
Independent	Martyn Harris	0.8	16	16							
Independent	Gordon Davidson	0.1	1								
Electorate: 7,886 Valid: 2,087 Spoilt: 25 Quota: 1,044 Turnout: 2,112

Forres by-election (11 November 2010) - 1 seat
Party	Candidate	FPv%	Count							
Party	Candidate	FPv%	1	2	3	4	5	6	7	8
SNP	Aaron John McLean	24.1	773	774	789	800	837	899	950	1,045
Independent	Lorna Creswell	17.5	562	576	615	686	726	878	999	1,399
Independent	Anne Audrey Skene	14.4	463	464	491	541	572	695	860	
Conservative	Paul McBain	14.4	463	464	476	486	491	511		
Green	Fabio Villani	12.5	401	405	419	433	459			
Labour	Mark Cascarino	6.1	195	195	201	205				
Independent	Janet Kennedy	6.0	192	194	201					
Scottish Senior Citizens	Andy Anderson	4.1	132	135						
Independent	Jane Elizabeth Cotton	0.9	30							
Electorate: 11,224 Valid: 3,210 Spoilt: 23 Quota: 1,606 Turnout: 28.8%

=== 2012-2017 ===
Heldon and Laich by-election (7 March 2013) – 1 Seat
Party	Candidate	FPv%	Count				
Party	Candidate	FPv%	1	2	3	4	5
Independent	John Cowe	31.4	972	1,020	1,058	1,273	1,507
SNP	Stuart Crowther	26.9	833	844	891	960	1,005
Conservative	Pete Bloomfield	15.3	473	490	516	558	
Independent	Nick Traynor	13.5	418	459	496		
Green	James Edward Mackessack-Leitch	7.4	228	242			
Independent	Jeff Hamilton	5.7	175				
Electorate: 10,579 Valid: 3,099 Spoilt: 38 Quota: 1,550 Turnout: 29.7%

Buckie by-election (30 January 2014) – 1 Seat
Party	Candidate	FPv%	Count		
Party	Candidate	FPv%	1	2	3
Independent	Gordon Cowie	43.9	830	907	1,034
SNP	Linda McDonald	35.5	670	679	710
Independent	Marc Macrae	11.7	220	248	
Conservative	Margaret Gambles	7.6	143		
Electorate: 7,872 Valid: 1,889 Spoilt: 26 Quota: 933 Turnout: 24.3%

Elgin City North by-election (11 December 2014) – 1 Seat
Party	Candidate	FPv%	Count				
Party	Candidate	FPv%	1	2	3	4	5
SNP	Kirsty Ella Reid	38.0	728	748	764	773	850
Independent	Sandy Cooper	24.6	472	483	499	595	693
UKIP	Captain Craig Ahab Graham	15.0	287	305	316	368	
Conservative	Alex Griffiths	14.2	273	280	299		
Labour	Ramsay Urquhart	4.2	81	84			
Green	Morvern Forrest	4.0	77				
Electorate: 9,263 Valid: 1,918 Spoilt: 20 Quota: 960 Turnout: 20.9%

Buckie by-election (26 March 2015) – 1 Seat
Party	Candidate	FPv%	Count
Party	Candidate	FPv%	1
SNP	Sonya Warren	59.5	1,485
Independent	Norman Calder	27.9	696
Conservative	Tim Eagle	12.6	315
Electorate: 7,798 Valid: 2,496 Spoilt: 25 Quota: 1,249 Turnout: 32.3%

Heldon and Laich by-election (1 October 2015) – 1 Seat
Party	Candidate	FPv%	Count		
Party	Candidate	FPv%	1	2	3
Independent	Dennis Slater	41.1	1,323	1,382	1,775
SNP	Joyce O'Hara	31.1	1,003	1,054	1,100
Conservative	Pete Bloomfield	21.8	703	725	
Green	James Edward Mackessack-Leitch	6.0	192		
Electorate: 11,070 Valid: 3,221 Spoilt: 27 Quota: 1,612 Turnout: 29.3%

=== 2017-2022 ===
Elgin City North by-election (13 July 2017) - 1 seat
Party	Candidate	FPv%	Count		
Party	Candidate	FPv%	1	2	3
Conservative	Maria McLean	40.0	923	970	1,061
SNP	Patsy Gowans	38.8	895	904	994
Labour	Nick Taylor	15.8	365	389	
Independent	Terry Monaghan	5.4	124		
Electorate: 9,354 Valid: 2,307 Spoilt: 17 Quota: 1,155 Turnout: 24.8%

Keith and Cullen by-election (21 November 2019) - 1 seat
Party	Candidate	FPv%	Count		
Party	Candidate	FPv%	1	2	3
Conservative	Laura Powell	41.5	1,142	1,177	1,339
SNP	Jock McKay	38.1	1,047	1,077	1,184
Independent	Rob Barsby	12.7	349	430	
Liberal Democrats	Ian Aitchison	7.7	212		
Electorate: 8,191 Valid: 2,778 Spoilt: 28 Quota: 1,376 Turnout: 33.9%

=== 2022-2027 ===
Buckie by-election (3 November 2022) - 1 seat
Party	Candidate	FPv%	Count			
Party	Candidate	FPv%	1	2	3	4
SNP	John Stuart	48.9	1,172	1,181	1,192	1,269
Conservative	Tim Eagle	36.7	879	884	904	989
Labour	Keighley Goldie	10.0	239	247	276	
Liberal Democrats	Les Tarr	2.8	67	78		
Independent	Neil Houlden	1.6	38			
Electorate: 8,139 Valid: 2,395 Spoilt: 13 Quota: 1,199 Turnout: 29.6%

Elgin City South by-election (7 November 2024) - 1 seat
Party	Candidate	FPv%	Count		
Party	Candidate	FPv%	1	2	3
SNP	Laura Mitchell	32.2	849	928	1,093
Conservative	Elaine Kirby	31.6	834	962	1,160
Labour	Catriona McBain	18.5	487	615	
Liberal Democrats	Neil Alexander	17.7	466		
Electorate: 10,355 Valid: 2,636 Spoilt: 33 Quota: 1,319 Turnout: 25.8%
