= Moray =

Council area of Scotland

Moray: Moireibh (Scottish Gaelic); Moray (Scots)
- Council area
- Coat of arms

- Moray shown within Scotland
- Coordinates: 57°25′N 3°15′W
- Sovereign state: United Kingdom
- Country: Scotland
- Lieutenancy area: Moray; Banffshire (part)
- Unitary authority: 1 April 1996
- Administrative HQ: Elgin

Government
  - Type: Council
  - Body: Moray Council
  - Control: No overall control
  - MPs: 2 MPs: Graham Leadbitter (SNP); Seamus Logan (SNP)
  - MSPs: 2 MSPs: Richard Lochhead (SNP); Karen Adam (SNP)

Area
  - Total: 864 sq mi (2,238 km^{2})
  - Rank: 8th

Population (2025)
  - Total: 94,730
  - Rank: 24th
  - Density: 110/sq mi (42/km^{2})
- Time zone: UTC+0 (GMT)
  - Summer (DST): UTC+1 (BST)
- ISO 3166 code: GB-MRY
- GSS code: S12000020
- Website: moray.gov.uk

Moray (/ˈmʌri/; Scottish Gaelic: Moireibh or Moireabh) is one of the 32 council areas of Scotland. It lies in the north-east of the country, with a coastline on the Moray Firth, and borders the council areas of Aberdeenshire and Highland. Its council is based in Elgin, the area's largest town. The main towns are generally in the north of the area on the coastal plain. The south of the area is more sparsely populated and mountainous, including part of the Cairngorms National Park.

The council area is named after the historic county of Moray (called Elginshire prior to 1919), which was in turn named after the medieval Province of Moray, each of which covered different areas to the modern council area. The modern area of Moray was created in 1975 as a lower-tier district within the Grampian Region. The Moray district became a single-tier council area in 1996.

== History ==
The name, first attested around 970 as Moreb, and in Latinised form by 1124 as Moravia, derives from the earlier Celtic forms *mori 'sea' and *treb 'settlement' (cf. Welsh môr-tref).

During the Middle Ages, the Province of Moray was much larger than the modern council area, also covering much of what is now Highland. During this period Moray's status fluctuated; it was sometimes an independent kingdom, and at other times a vassal of Alba (early Scotland) to the south. In the early 12th century, Moray's last independent ruler, Óengus of Moray, was defeated by David I of Scotland, and the area was then absorbed into the Kingdom of Scotland. It was divided into the shires of Elginshire, Nairnshire and the mainland parts of Inverness-shire. Elginshire was seen as the core of the old Moray territory and so was often informally called Moray. In 1919 Elginshire County Council renamed the county Moray.

The modern territory called Moray was created in 1975 under the Local Government (Scotland) Act 1973, which abolished Scotland's counties, burghs and landward districts and replaced them with a two-tier system of regions and districts. The new Moray district covered ten of the twelve previous districts of the county of Moray plus over half of the area of the neighbouring county of Banffshire to the east:

From the county of Moray

- Burghead burgh
- Duffus and Drainie district
- Elgin burgh
- Elgin district
- Fochabers district
- Forres burgh
- Forres district
- Lossiemouth and Branderburgh burgh
- Rothes burgh
- Rothes and Knockando burgh

From Banffshire

- Aberlour burgh
- Buckie burgh
- Buckie district
- Cullen burgh
- Cullen district (except parish of Fordyce, which went to Banff and Buchan)
- Dufftown burgh
- Dufftown district
- Findochty burgh
- Keith burgh
- Keith district
- Portknockie burgh

The only two districts from the pre-1975 county of Moray that were not included in the new Moray district were the burgh of Grantown-on-Spey and the surrounding Cromdale district, which went instead to the Badenoch and Strathspey district of the Highland region. This area had been a comparatively recent addition to the county, having been part of Inverness-shire until 1870. The eastern parts of Banffshire not included in the new Moray district went to the Banff and Buchan district. Moray District Council was a district-level authority, with regional-level functions provided by the Grampian Regional Council, based in Aberdeen.

The districts and regions created in 1975 were abolished in 1996, under the Local Government etc. (Scotland) Act 1994 and replaced with single-tier council areas. The Moray district became one of the new council areas.

The boundaries of the pre-1975 county of Moray are still used for some limited official purposes connected with land registration, being a registration county. The Moray lieutenancy area covers the parts of the pre-1975 county that are within the modern council area (being the pre-1975 county excluding Cromdale and Grantown-on-Spey). The Banffshire lieutenancy area covers the pre-1975 county, which therefore straddles the modern Moray and Aberdeenshire council areas.

== Politics ==
Moray Council is based at the Council Offices in Elgin, formerly the offices of the old Moray and Nairn Joint County Council.

Moray is represented in large part by the Moray West, Nairn and Strathspey constituency, and in small part by the Aberdeenshire North and Moray East constituency. The MP for the Moray West, Nairn and Strathspey constituency is Graham Leadbitter of the SNP, and the MP for the Aberdeenshire North and Moray East constituency is Seamus Logan of the SNP.

For the Scottish Parliament, the majority of Moray is in the Moray constituency and the Highlands and Islands electoral region. The eastern corner of Moray (consisting of the Buckie ward and the eastern part of the Keith and Cullen ward) is instead in the Banffshire and Buchan Coast constituency and the North-East Scotland electoral region.

In the 2014 Scottish independence referendum, Moray voted 'No' by an above-average percentage of 57.6%. In the 2016 European Union membership referendum, Moray voted 'Remain' by a 50.1% margin, ahead of Dumfries and Galloway (53.1%) and Aberdeenshire (55.0%). Moray had the biggest percentage for 'Leave' out of all the Scottish council areas and the narrowest margin of victory for either side anywhere in the UK.

== Settlements ==
The largest settlements in Moray.

The large majority of Moray's population live in the northern part of the district; only one of its eight wards covers the glens to the south. Elgin is by far the largest town, being home to 25% of the population at the 2011 census.

Largest settlements by population:

Settlement	Population (2020)
Elgin	25,040
Forres	9,900
Buckie	9,010
Lossiemouth	6,840
Keith	4,610
Burghead	1,840
Lhanbryde	1,830
Fochabers	1,770
Hopeman	1,710
Dufftown	1,590

== Education ==
In 2026, there were 52 schools in Moray, including 44 primary and eight secondary schools in Moray.

In 2026, the council operated 11 public libraries.

Moray is also home to the University of the Highlands and Islands affiliated Moray College, and to Gordonstoun independent boarding school and its accompanying preparatory school, Aberlour House.

The secondary schools are:

- Buckie High School
- Elgin Academy
- Elgin High School
- Forres Academy
- Gordonstoun
- Keith Grammar School
- Lossiemouth High School
- Milne's High School
- Speyside High School

== Infrastructure ==
Moray Council is also responsible for the maintenance of 1,000 miles of roads, 450 miles of footpaths, 468 bridges, 16,000 street lights and 10,500 road signs.

== Drug issues ==
In 2020, Scotland had the highest number of drug-related deaths in Europe, almost 3.5 times higher than the rest of the UK.

Figures from the National Records of Scotland show there were 17 drug deaths in the Moray area in 2018 compared to 7 the year before. That compares to 10 in both 2016 and 2015, 2 in 2014 and 5 in 2013. The 2018 figures for the Moray area were the highest since records began in 1996, mirroring the national picture.

In 2019, 12 drug-related deaths were reported - 5 fewer than the record high of the previous year. This represents a drug-related death rate per 1,000 people of 0.12. By comparison, the death rate in neighbouring Aberdeenshire per 1,000 people was 0.08; in Dundee it was 0.36 (the highest in the country); in Glasgow it was 0.35 (the second highest in the country); the lowest in Scotland was Orkney with a rate of 0.06.

== Economy ==
=== Employment ===
The working population of Moray in 2003 was nearly 40,000: of whom around 34,000 were employees and 6000 self-employed. Of these 34,000, 31% were employed in the public sector, compared with 27% for Scotland and 25% for the UK (the RAF personnel are not included in these figures) and only 18% of jobs are managerial or professional, compared to 25% for Scotland.

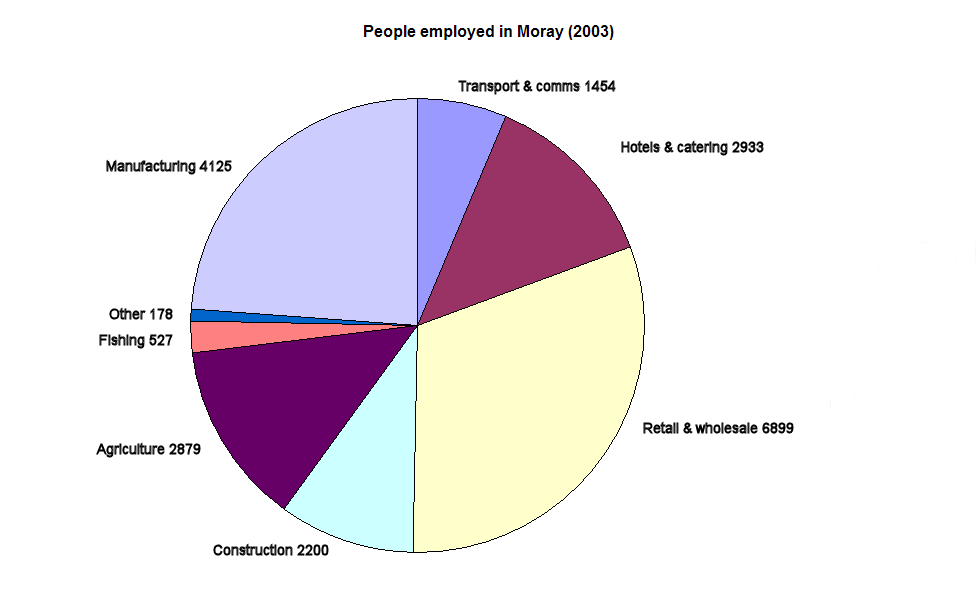
People employed in Moray (2003)

In 2024, the employment rate in Moray was 71.9%, the unemployment rate 3.0% and the economically inactive 24.7%.

=== Economic performance and development ===
The gross value added (GVA) in Moray was £1.26 billion in 2003. This corresponds to an output of £14,500 per resident and was 6% below the average for Scotland and 12% below that of the UK.

The diagrams show the strong reliance on the food and drink industry, i.e. the distilling, canned food and biscuit manufacturing industries. The public sector is also very prominent. Of the total GVA of £1.26 billion, food and drink is responsible for 19% while 3% is the Scottish figure and 2% for the UK. Moray is responsible for 9% of the entire food and drink GVA of Scotland. Significant areas where Moray has a larger than average share of national markets are in tourism, forest products, textiles and specialised metal working. In contrast, however, Moray is significantly underrepresented in the business services area at 15% of GVA, while it is 19% for Scotland and 25% for the UK.

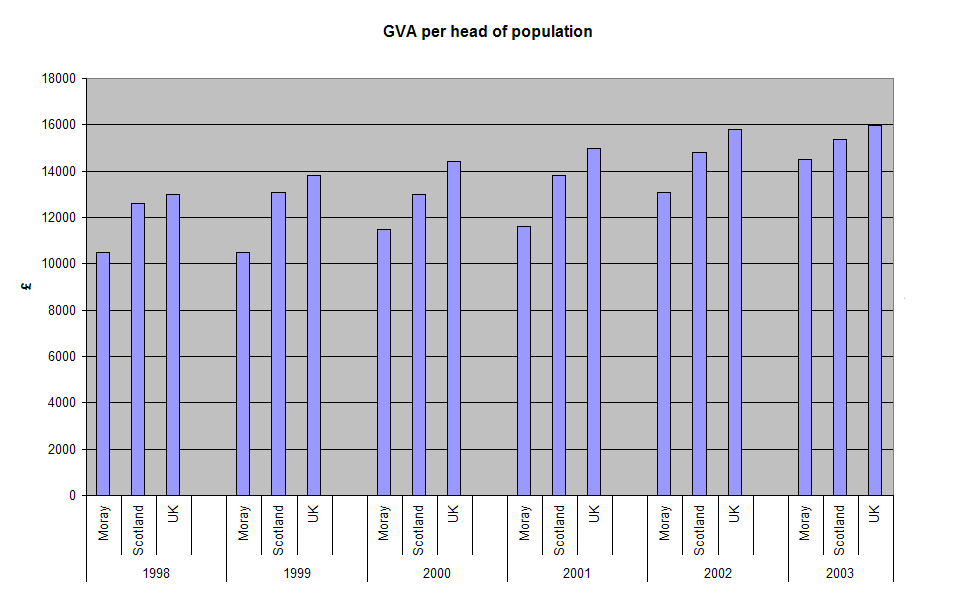
GVA per head of population (1998 - 2003), comparing Moray, Scotland and the whole UK

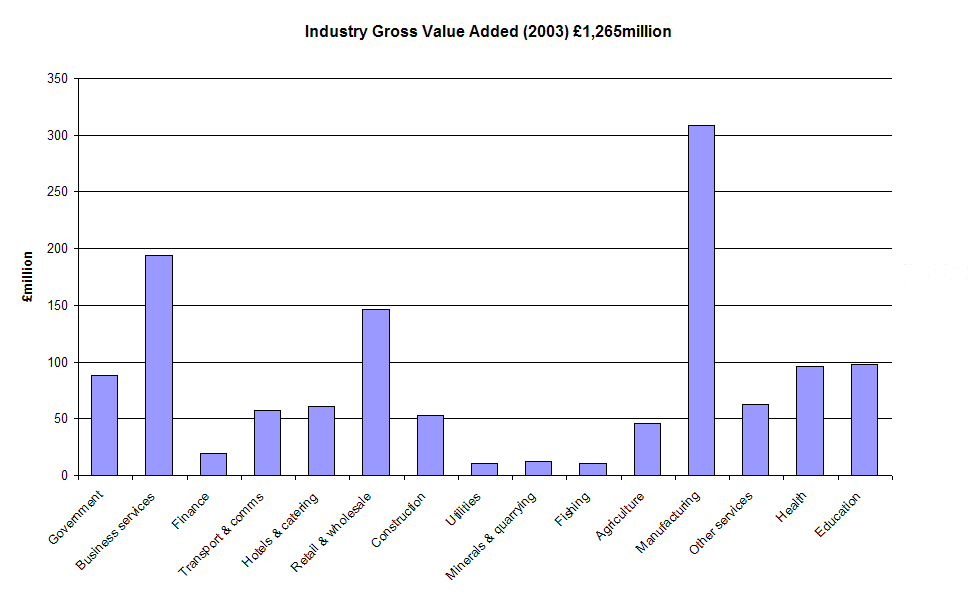
Industry GVA (2003)

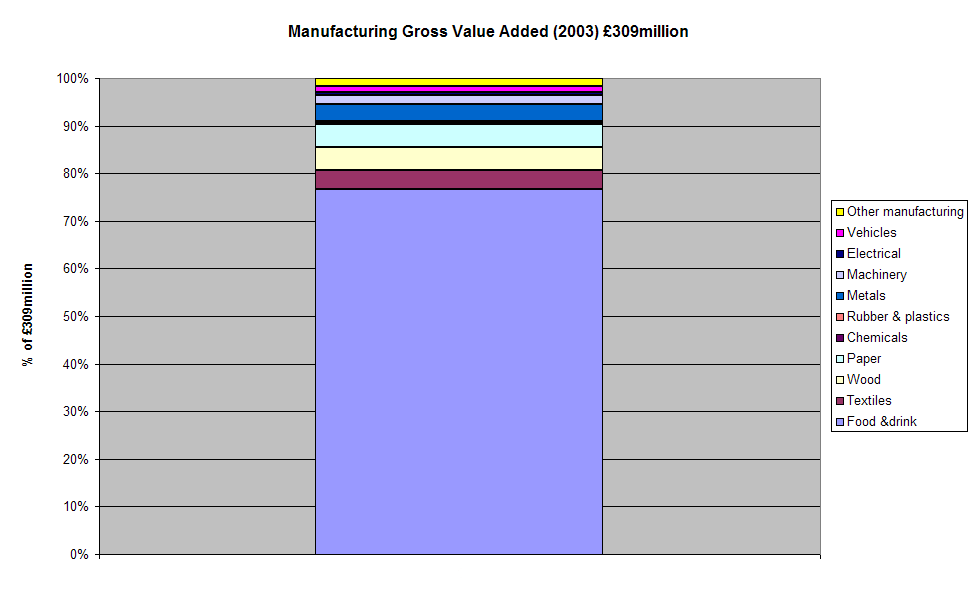
Manufacturing GVA (2003)

In March 2014 a tourism strategy was launched by the Moray Economic Partnership aimed at doubling the £95m industry over the next decade. In June 2014 a website (morayspeyside.com) was launched under the auspices of the Moray Chamber of Commerce to support the strategy and provide a one-stop shop for visitors.

=== Business base ===
VAT registered enterprises in Moray (2004)

In 2004, there were around 2,500 VAT registered businesses in Moray, with 75% of businesses employing fewer than five people and about half of firms with a turnover of less than £100,000. 60% of employees are employed in small firms, compared to 48% for Scotland as a whole. Moray's major companies export their products to other British regions and abroad and many of the smaller companies have direct involvement with neighbouring economies in Aberdeen, Aberdeenshire, and Highland. Also, a large outward-commuting workforce (estimated to be in excess of 5,000 people) derives its income from the neighbouring centres of Aberdeen and Inverness. In 2026, the Moray Business Enterprise Hub stated there were over 3,000 small and medium-sized enterprises in Moray.

Note: 2003 and 2004 data at SCOTDAT was the most up-to-date, as of August 2006

== Demographics ==
An inhabitant of Moray, especially the historic Mormaer of Moray, is called, 'Moravian.'

Source: General Register Office for Scotland.

=== Ethnicity ===
Ethnic Group	2001		2011		2022	
Ethnic Group	Number	%	Number	%	Number	%
White: Total	86,175	99.12%	92,263	98.89%	91,055	97.60%
White: Scottish	69,948	80.46%	72,470	77.68%	68,785	73.73%
White: Other British	14,629	16.83%	16,823	18.03%	18,674	20.02%
White: Irish	409	0.47%	430	0.46%	514	0.55%
White: Gypsy/Traveller (Note: New category created for the 2011 census)	–	–	79	0.08%	87	0.09%
White: Polish	–	–	985	1.06%	1,080	1.16%
White: Other	1,189	1.37%	1,476	1.58%	1,915	2.05%
Asian, Asian Scottish or Asian British: Total	402	0.46%	599	0.64%	913	0.98%
Asian, Asian Scottish or Asian British: Indian	71	0.08%	101	0.11%	199	0.21%
Asian, Asian Scottish or Asian British: Pakistani	124	0.14%	149	0.16%	152	0.16%
Asian, Asian Scottish or Asian British: Bangladeshi	17	–	16	–	57	0.06%
Asian, Asian Scottish or Asian British: Chinese	151	0.17%	164	0.18%	201	0.22%
Asian, Asian Scottish or Asian British: Asian Other	39	–	169	0.18%	298	0.32%
Black, Black Scottish or Black British (Note: Category restructured for the 2011 census)	19	–	–	–	–	–
African: Total	36	–	88	0.09%	156	0.17%
African: African, African Scottish or African British	–	–	78	0.08%	13	–
African: Other African	–	–	10	–	147	0.16%
Caribbean or Black: Total	–	–	57	0.06%	111	0.12%
Caribbean	54	0.06%	43	0.05%	44	0.05%
Black	–	–	11	–	15	–
Caribbean or Black: Other	–	–	3	–	52	–
Mixed or multiple ethnic groups: Total	150	0.17%	232	0.25%	708	0.76%
Other: Total	104	0.12%	56	0.06%	352	0.38%
Other: Arab	–	–	26	0.03%	116	0.12%
Other: Any other ethnic group	–	–	30	–	236	0.25%
Total:	86,940	100.00%	93,295	100.00%	93,293	100.00%

=== Language ===
The first records on language use in the area indicate that in 1705, most of Moray except for the coast was described as "Wholly Irish & Highland Countreys" and "Ye Irish Parishes in which both languages are spoken." By 1822, Scottish Gaelic had weakened in the area, with only the far south of Moray reporting that, at most, 10% of the population were speaking Gaelic better than English. Records towards the end of the 19th century improved and show that between 1881 and 1921 the percentage of Gaelic speakers in Moray fluctuated as shown in the following table:

Year	Gaelic speakers (%)
1881	2.63
1891	5.64
1901	4.48
1911	2.98
1921	2.08
1991	0.56

The 2022 Scottish Census reported that out of 90,792 residents aged three and over, 1,028 (1.1%) considered themselves able to speak or read Gaelic.

==== Scots language ====
The 2022 Scottish Census reported that out of 90,794 residents aged three and over, 38,941 (42.9%) considered themselves able to speak or read the Scots language.

== Accidents and disasters ==
One of the earliest known disasters is the Storegga Slide in the mesolithic period in 6225–6170 BCE which caused tsunami waves to hit North sea coastal areas, with wave heights of 3–6 meters in the north east Scotland areas.

During the Roman conquest of Britain, in AD 83, the Battle of Mons Graupius took place in an unknown location in northern Scotland. A number of Roman marching camps were located in Aberdeenshire and Moray. According to the Roman historian Tacitus, 10,000 Caledonian people died at a cost of 360 Roman troops.

Vikings raids started in the British Isles in the late 8th century. In 839, the Battle of 839 took place in which the Vikings had a decisive victory against the Picts. The location of the battle is unknown but is likely based around Moray and Easter Ross and the battle has been described as one of the most important battles in British history. After the Kingdom of Alba was established, the Battle of Bauds was fought west of Cullen in 962, a battle in which the Vikings were defeated.

In 1040, the Battle of Pitgaveny was fought between the forces of Duncan I of Scotland and Macbeth, at the time the ruler of Moray, at Bothganown, modern day Pitgaveny, near Elgin. In 1270, Elgin Cathedral was partly destroyed by a fire. Later the cathedral was burned in 1390 by Alexander Stewart, Robert III's brother, and burned again in 1402 be Alexander, Lord of Lochaber. In 1594, the Battle of Glenlivet, a Scottish clan battle, was fought near Glenlivet between Protestant and Catholic forces. 500 Protestants and 14 Catholics died.

In the 19th century, a number of maritime accidents occurred. A storm struck the east coast of Scotland causing the Stotfield fishing disaster in 1806 resulting in the death of 21 fishermen. The Muckle Spate was a flood in 1829 which caused the death of 6-8 people, 22 bridges and 60 houses were destroyed and 600 families were made homeless. The Moray Firth fishing disaster occurred in 1848 when a storm caused the death of 100 fishermen from the east coast harbours. Other maritime accidents include the Osprey ship wreck in 1865 causing the death of the three crew members.

In 1940, during World War II, the British minesweeper HMS Sphinx (J69) was attacked and bombed by German aircraft while minesweeping in the Moray Firth. 49 men were lost. Also in 1940, the coastal tanker Shelbrit 1 struck a mine and sank in the Moray Firth with the loss of 21 men.

In more recent time, in 1971, the Cairngorm Plateau disaster took place. Five students and a leader died on a mountaineering expedition when stranded in a blizzard 2 km north of Ben Macdui. The disaster is regarded as Britain's worst mountaineering accident. A rail accident occurred in 1983 in Elgin when a passenger train was derailed resulting in one killed and 12 injured. In 1988, the oil platform Piper Alpha, located 200 km north-east of Buckie, exploded and collapsed, killing 165. In 1998, Arlene Fraser disappeared in Elgin, a case where the body was never found, but her husband was later convicted of murder. In 2021, the storm Storm Arwen caused the loss of power for 80,000 in northern Scotland, including the Moray coast.

== See also ==
- List of places in Moray
