= Moray West, Nairn and Strathspey =

UK Parliament constituency (since 2024)

- County constituency for the House of Commons
- Interactive map of boundaries from 2024
- Boundary of Moray West, Nairn and Strathspey in Scotland
- Subdivisions of Scotland: Highland and Moray
- Electorate: 76,237 (March 2020)
- Major settlements: Elgin, Nairn, Forres

Current constituency
- Created: 2024
- Member of Parliament: Graham Leadbitter (SNP)
- Seats: One
- Created from: Moray & Inverness, Nairn, Badenoch and Strathspey

Moray West, Nairn and Strathspey is a constituency of the House of Commons in the UK Parliament. Further to the completion of the 2023 review of Westminster constituencies, it was first contested at the 2024 general election, and is currently represented by Graham Leadbitter of the Scottish National Party.

== Boundaries ==
The constituency comprises the following:

- In full: the Highland Council wards of Nairn and Cawdor, Badenoch and Strathspey; and the Moray Council wards of Elgin City North, Elgin City South, Forres, Heldon and Laich, Speyside Glenlivet.
- In part: the Highland Council ward of Culloden and Ardersier (eastern areas comprising minority of electorate); and the Moray Council ward of Fochabers Lhanbryde (west of the River Spey).

The majority of the electorate, comprising the areas in Moray Council were previously part of the former Moray constituency; the areas in Highland Council were part of the abolished Inverness, Nairn, Badenoch and Strathspey constituency.

== Members of Parliament ==
Election	Member	Party
2024	Graham Leadbitter	SNP

== Election results ==
=== Elections in the 2020s ===
General election 2024: Moray West, Nairn and Strathspey
Party	Candidate	Votes	%	±%
SNP	Graham Leadbitter	14,961	32.1	−14.0
Conservative	Kathleen Robertson	13,960	30.0	−10.9
Labour	James Hynam	8,259	17.7	+13.1
Liberal Democrats	Neil Alexander	3,785	8.1	+2.2
Reform UK	Steve Skerret	3,490	7.5	+6.9
Green	Draeyk Van Der Horn	1,676	3.6	+2.4
Scottish Family	Euan Morrice	423	0.9	N/A
Majority		1,001	2.1	
Turnout		46,554	60.4	
SNP hold		Swing	−1.5	

=== Elections in the 2010s ===
2019 notional result (Note: Estimate of the 2019 general election result as if the revised boundaries recommended under the 2023 boundary review were in place)
Party	Vote	%
SNP	25,941	46.1
Conservative	23,035	40.9
Liberal Democrats	3,307	5.9
Labour	2,606	4.6
Scottish Greens	649	1.2
UKIP	413	0.7
Brexit Party	321	0.6
Majority	2,906	5.2
Turnout	56,272	73.8
Electorate	76,237	
