= 2012 Moray Council election =

2012 Scottish local government election

- 3 May 2012

All 26 seats to Moray Council 14 seats needed for a majority
	First party	Second party
Leader	Gary Coull	Stewart Cree
Party	SNP	Independent
Leader's seat	Speyside Glenlivet	Keith and Cullen
Last election	9 seats, 35.2%	12 seats, 36.9%
Seats before	10	12
Seats won	10	10
Seat change	▲1	▼2
Popular vote	10,124	7,386
Percentage	39.4%	28.8%
Swing	▲4.2%	▼8.1%
	Third party	Fourth party
Leader	Allan Wright	John Divers
Party	Conservative	Labour
Leader's seat	Heldon and Laich	Elgin City South
Last election	3 seats, 15.8%	2 seats, 8.7%
Seats before	2	2
Seats won	3	3
Seat change	Steady	▲1
Popular vote	4,501	2,351
Percentage	17.5%	9.2%
Swing	▲1.7%	▲0.5%
- Results by ward

Council Leader before election
Gordon McDonald
Independent
Council Leader after election
Allan Wright
Conservative

The 2012 Moray Council election was held on 3 May 2012, the same day as the other 31 local authorities in Scotland. The election used the eight wards created under the Local Governance (Scotland) Act 2004, with 26 councillors being elected. Each ward elected either 3 or 4 members, using the STV electoral system.

The election saw the Scottish National Party (SNP) increase their representation by 1 seat, equalling the seat numbers of the independents who lost 2 seats, while becoming the largest party on the council in terms of vote share. The Conservatives retained their 3 seats while Labour gained an additional seat.

Following the election, a coalition was formed between the independents and the Conservatives which was a continuance of the arrangement from 2007 to 2012.

== Background ==
=== Previous election ===
The previous election in 2007 were the first in Moray to use the STV electoral system. The results in 2007 saw the traditionally independent controlled council become an independent-Conservative controlled council. The independent group lost 4 seats, as the SNP gained 6, and the Conservatives gained 2. Labour lost 3, and the Liberal Democrats lost any representation on the council.

2007 Moray Council election results
Party	Seats	Vote share
Independent	12	36.9%
SNP	9	35.2%
Conservative	3	15.8%
Labour	2	8.7%

=== Composition ===
There were 2 by-elections in the 2007–12 term term. One by-election was in the Elgin City South ward, which resulted in an SNP gain from independent. The other by-election was held in the Forres ward, which resulted in an independent gain from Conservative.

Composition of Moray Council
Party	2007 election	Dissolution
Independent	12	12
SNP	9	10
Conservative	3	2
Labour	3	3

== Results ==
2012 Moray Council election result
Party	Seats	Gains	Losses	Net gain/loss	Seats %	Votes %	Votes	+/−
SNP	10	1	0	▲1	38.5	39.5	10,124	▲4.2
Independent	10	1	3	▼2	38.5	28.8	7,386	▼8.1
Conservative	3	1	1	Steady	11.5	17.5	4,501	▲1.7
Labour	3	1	0	▲1	11.5	9.2	2,351	▲0.5
Green	0	0	0	Steady	0.0	2.8	719	New
UKIP	0	0	0	Steady	0.0	1.3	340	▲1.0
Liberal Democrats	0	0	0	Steady	0.0	0.7	167	▼1.1
Scottish Senior Citizens	0	0	0	Steady	0.0	0.3	78	▼1.0
Total	26						25,666	

Note: "Votes" are the first preference votes. The net gain/loss and percentage changes relate to the result of the previous Scottish local elections on 3 May 2007. This may differ from other published sources showing gain/loss relative to seats held at dissolution of Scotland's councils.

== Ward results ==
=== Speyside Glenlivet ===
- 2007: 2xSNP; 1xIndependent
- 2012: 2xSNP; 1xIndependent
- 2007-2012 Change: No change

Speyside Glenlivet – 3 seats
Party	Candidate	FPv%	Count		
Party	Candidate	FPv%	1	2	3
Independent	Fiona Murdoch (incumbent)	27.59%	771		
SNP	Pearl Paul (incumbent)	27.17%	759		
SNP	Mike McConnachie (incumbent)	22.87%	639	656.6	705.6
Conservative	David Gambles	13.46%	376	393.2	395
UKIP	Matthew Desmond	5.73%	160	168	170.1
UKIP	Don Gatt	3.19%	89	96.1	97.9
Electorate: 7,059 Valid: 2,794 Spoilt: 40 Quota: 699 Turnout: 2,834 (39.58%)

=== Keith and Cullen ===
- 2007: 2xIndependent; 1xSNP
- 2012: 2xIndependent; 1xSNP
- 2007-2012 Change: No change

Keith and Cullen – 3 seats
Party	Candidate	FPv%	Count				
Party	Candidate	FPv%	1	2	3	4	5
SNP	Gary Coull (incumbent)	42.45%	1,319				
Independent	Ron Shepherd (incumbent)	22.59%	702	750.5	866.7		
Independent	Stewart Cree (incumbent)	15.25%	474	591.5	706.1	752.5	964.8
Conservative	Valery Dickson	10.04%	312	336.2			
SNP	Hazel Thain	9.66%	300	615.2	633.5	650.6	
Electorate: 7,810 Valid: 3,107 Spoilt: 33 Quota: 777 Turnout: 3,140 (39.78%)

=== Buckie ===
- 2007: 2xIndependent; 1xSNP
- 2012: 2xIndependent; 1xSNP
- 2007-2012 Change: No change

Buckie – 3 seats
Party	Candidate	FPv%	Count			
Party	Candidate	FPv%	1	2	3	4
SNP	Gordon McDonald (incumbent)	38.37%	967			
Independent	Anne McKay (incumbent) ††	25.71%	648			
Independent	Joe Mackay (incumbent) ††††	22.10%	557	596.9	607.2	728.6
Conservative	Margaret Gambles	7.1%	179	183.2	184.9	
SNP	Linda Scobie McDonald	6.71%	169	449.1	451.7	457.5
Electorate: 7,336 Valid: 2,520 Spoilt: 39 Quota: 631 Turnout: 2,559 (34.35%)

=== Fochabers Lhanbryde ===
- 2007: 1xSNP; 1xCon; 1xIndependent
- 2012: 1xCon; 1xSNP; 1xLab
- 2007-2012 Change: Lab gain one seat from Independent

Fochabers Lhanbryde – 3 seats
Party	Candidate	FPv%	Count			
Party	Candidate	FPv%	1	2	3	4
Conservative	Douglas Ross (incumbent)	39.5%	1,318			
SNP	Margo Howe	21.82%	728	768.7	810.2	1,335
SNP	Anita McDonald (incumbent)	18.34%	612	676.1	708.2	
Labour	Sean Morton	15.34%	512	583.5	714.7	793.9
Liberal Democrats	Peter Horton	5.0%	167	304.1		
Electorate: 7,717 Valid: 3,337 Spoilt: 28 Quota: 835 Turnout: 3,365 (43.24%)

=== Heldon and Laich ===
- 2007: 2xIndependent; 1xSNP; 1xCon
- 2012: 2xIndependent; 1xSNP; 1xCon
- 2007-2012 Change: No change

Heldon and Laich – 4 seats
Party	Candidate	FPv%	Count					
Party	Candidate	FPv%	1	2	3	4	5	6
SNP	Carolle Ralph†	20.0%	797	807				
Independent	Eric McGillivray (incumbent)	18.44%	735	828				
Conservative	Allan Wright (incumbent)	17.26%	688	699	703.4	703.5	763.7	835.8
SNP	David Stewart (incumbent)	17.01%	678	687	692.1	699.4	740.9	
Independent	Chris Tuke	14.65%	584	659	670	670.4	764.1	921.7
Green	James Mackessack-Leitch	6.57%	262	279	281.3	281.7		
Independent	John Gordon	6.05%	241					
Electorate: 10,287 Valid: 3,985 Spoilt: 56 Quota: 798 Turnout: 4,041 (38.74%)

=== Elgin City North ===
- 2007: 1xSNP; 1xLab; 1xIndependent
- 2012: 2xSNP; 1xLab
- 2007-2012 Change: SNP gain one seat from Independent

Elgin City North – 3 seats
Party	Candidate	FPv%	Count				
Party	Candidate	FPv%	1	2	3	4	5
Labour	Barry Jarvis (incumbent)	29.85%	766				
SNP	Mike Shand (incumbent)	23.23%	596	612.5	661.7		
SNP	Patsy Gowans	20.07%	515	526.9	550.4	566.8	688.3
Conservative	Frank Brown	17.46%	448	466.9	565.8	566.3	
Independent	Darren Margach	9.39%	241	274.2			
Electorate: 8,386 Valid: 2,566 Spoilt: 31 Quota: 642 Turnout: 2,597 (30.6%)

=== Elgin City South ===
- 2007: 1xSNP; 1xLab; 1xIndependent
- 2012: 1xLab; 1xCon; 1xSNP
- 2007-2012 Change: Con gain from Independent

Elgin City South – 3 seats
Party	Candidate	FPv%	Count	
Party	Candidate	FPv%	1	2
Labour	John Divers (incumbent)	37.57%	1,073	
Conservative	James Allan	25.0%	714	810.1
SNP	Graham Leadbitter (incumbent)	23.63%	675	771.1
SNP	John Sharp (incumbent)	13.8%	394	434
Electorate: 8,356 Valid: 2,856 Spoilt: 40 Quota: 715 Turnout: 2,896 (34.18%)

=== Forres ===
- 2007: 2xIndependent; 1xSNP; 1xCon
- 2012: 3xIndependent; 1xSNP
- 2007-2012 Change: Independent gain one seat from Con

Forres – 4 seats
Party	Candidate	FPv%	Count									
Party	Candidate	FPv%	1	2	3	4	5	6	7	8	9	10
Independent	George Alexander	25.19%	1,134									
Independent	Lorna Creswell (incumbent)	12.77%	575	650.4	675.5	690.1	814.9	866.5	870.6	987.2		
SNP	Aaron McLean	12.15%	547	559.1	568.5	574.7	588.4	924.1				
Conservative	Paul McBain	10.35%	466	483.5	486.7	507.1	529.4	540.2	541			
Green	Fabio Villani	10.15%	457	474.7	488.1	492.1	524.2	548.6	551.9	614.2	630.7	
SNP	Irene Ogilvie (incumbent)	9.53%	429	440.3	443.7	446.9	478.2					
Independent	Anne Audrey Skene	9.11%	410	441.2	450.8	468.7	549.9	569.3	571.7	731.6	764.2	1,072.5
Independent	Jeff Hamilton (incumbent)	6.98%	314	343.8	349.8	356.2						
UKIP	Ian Meiklejohn	2.02%	91	96.1	98.5							
Scottish Senior Citizens	Andy Anderson	1.73%	78	85.4								
Electorate: 10,999 Valid: 4,501 Spoilt: 50 Quota: 901 Turnout: 4,551 (40.92%)

== Aftermath ==
As no single political group on the council won enough seats for a majority, the independent group and the Conservative group continued their coalition administration which had been in place since the 2007 election.

=== 2013 Heldon and Laich by-election ===
SNP councillor Carolle Ralph resigned her seat on 7 December 2012. The by-election was held in the Heldon and Laich ward on 7 March 2013 and was won by independent candidate John Cowe.

Heldon and Laich by-election (7 March 2013) – 1 Seat
Party	Candidate	FPv%	Count				
Party	Candidate	FPv%	1	2	3	4	5
Independent	John Cowe	31.4	972	1,020	1,058	1,273	1,507
SNP	Stuart Crowther	26.9	833	844	891	960	1,005
Conservative	Pete Bloomfield	15.3	473	490	516	558	
Independent	Nick Traynor	13.5	418	459	496		
Green	James Edward Mackessack-Leitch	7.4	228	242			
Independent	Jeff Hamilton	5.7	175				
Electorate: 10,579 Valid: 3,099 Spoilt: 38 Quota: 1,550 Turnout: 29.7%

=== 2014 Buckie by-election ===
Independent councillor Anne McKay resigned her seat on 13 November 2013. A by-election was held in the Buckie ward on 30 January 2014 and was won by independent candidate Gordon Cowie.

Buckie by-election (30 January 2014) – 1 Seat
Party	Candidate	FPv%	Count		
Party	Candidate	FPv%	1	2	3
Independent	Gordon Cowie	43.9	830	907	1,034
SNP	Linda McDonald	35.5	670	679	710
Independent	Marc Macrae	11.7	220	248	
Conservative	Margaret Gambles	7.6	143		
Electorate: 7,872 Valid: 1,889 Spoilt: 26 Quota: 933 Turnout: 24.3%

=== Elgin City North by-election ===
Labour councillor Barry Jarvis resigned his seat on 26 September 2014 to train as a teacher. A by-election was held in the Elgin City North ward on 11 December 2014 and the seat was won by the SNP candidate Kirsty Reid.

Elgin City North by-election (11 December 2014) – 1 Seat
Party	Candidate	FPv%	Count				
Party	Candidate	FPv%	1	2	3	4	5
SNP	Kirsty Ella Reid	38.0	728	748	764	773	850
Independent	Sandy Cooper	24.6	472	483	499	595	693
UKIP	Captain Craig Ahab Graham	15.0	287	305	316	368	
Conservative	Alex Griffiths	14.2	273	280	299		
Labour	Ramsay Urquhart	4.2	81	84			
Green	Morvern Forrest	4.0	77				
Electorate: 9,263 Valid: 1,918 Spoilt: 20 Quota: 960 Turnout: 20.9%

=== 2015 Buckie by-election ===
Independent councillor Joe Mackay died on 12 January 2015 after a fall from his mobility scooter. A by-election was held in the Buckie ward to fill the vacancy on 26 March 2015 and the seat was won by the SNP candidate Sonya Warren.

Buckie by-election (26 March 2015) – 1 Seat
Party	Candidate	FPv%	Count
Party	Candidate	FPv%	1
SNP	Sonya Warren	59.5	1,485
Independent	Norman Calder	27.9	696
Conservative	Tim Eagle	12.6	315
Electorate: 7,798 Valid: 2,496 Spoilt: 25 Quota: 1,249 Turnout: 32.3%

=== 2015 Heldon and Laich by-election ===
Independent councillor Eric McGillivray announced on 31 July 2015 he was standing down from the council for personal reasons. A by-election was held in the Heldon and Laich ward on 1 October 2015 and the seat was won by independent candidate Dennis Slater.

Heldon and Laich by-election (1 October 2015) – 1 Seat
Party	Candidate	FPv%	Count		
Party	Candidate	FPv%	1	2	3
Independent	Dennis Slater	41.1	1,323	1,382	1,775
SNP	Joyce O'Hara	31.1	1,003	1,054	1,100
Conservative	Pete Bloomfield	21.8	703	725	
Green	James Edward Mackessack-Leitch	6.0	192		
Electorate: 11,070 Valid: 3,221 Spoilt: 27 Quota: 1,612 Turnout: 29.3%
