= 2022 Moray Council election =

2022 Scottish local government election

- 5 May 2022

All 26 seats to Moray Council 14 seats needed for a majority
- Registered: 66,419
- Turnout: 45.0%
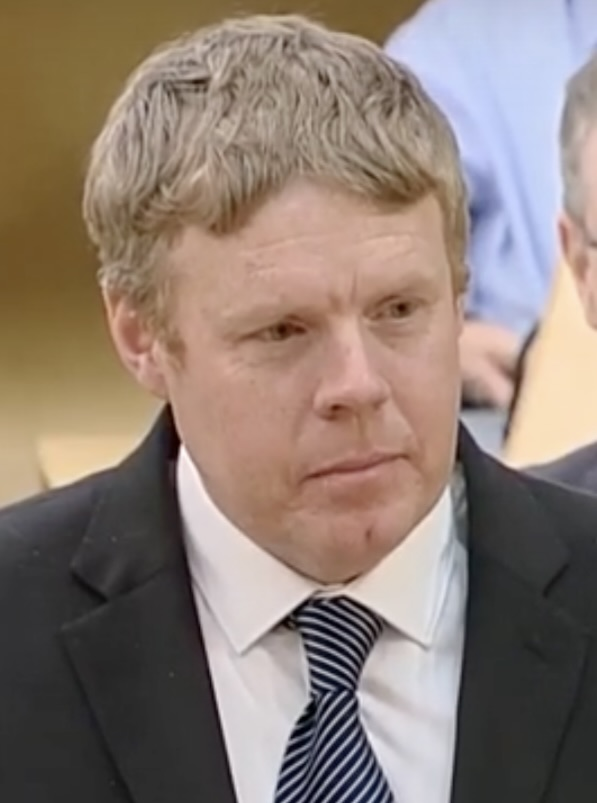

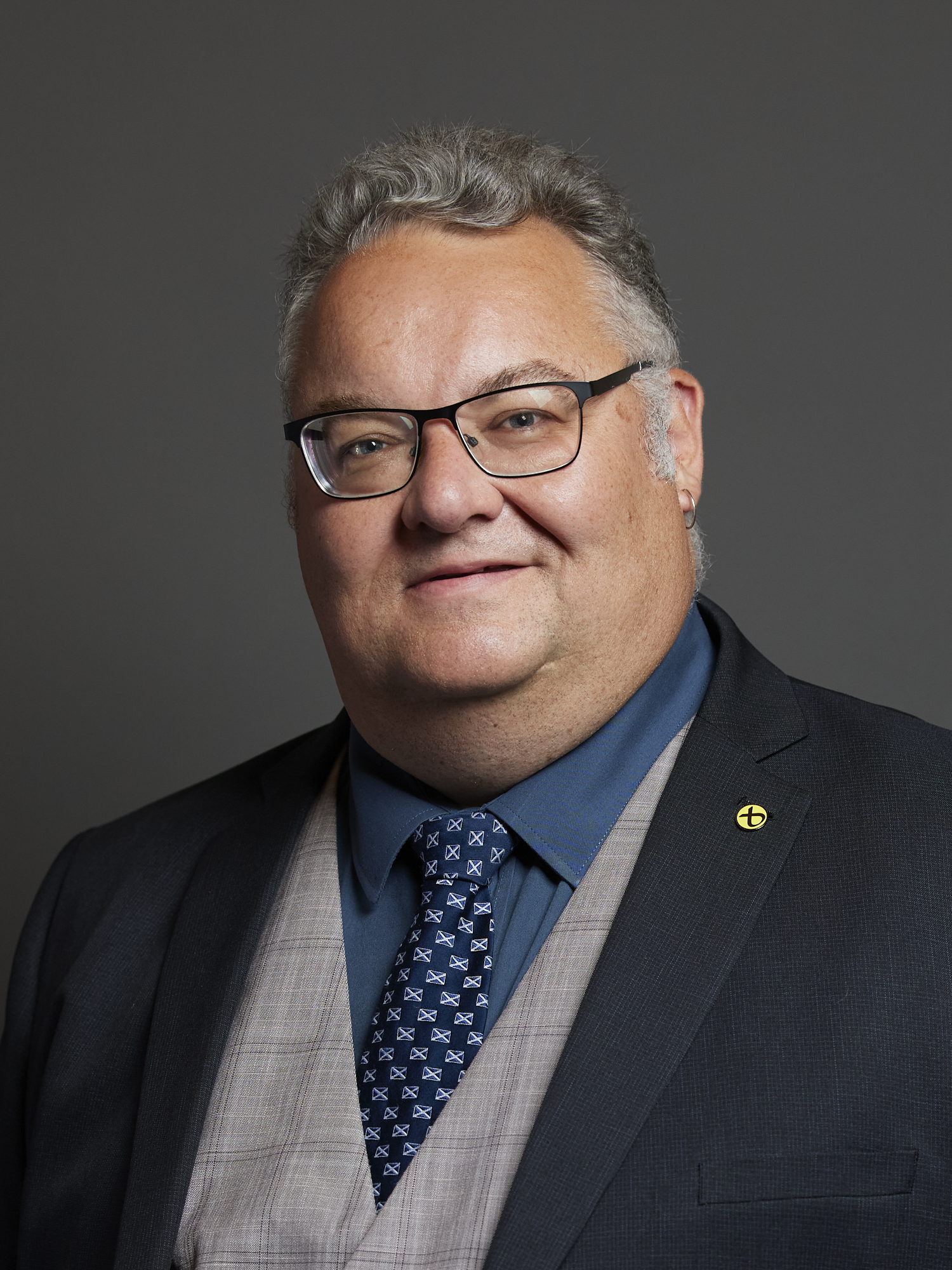

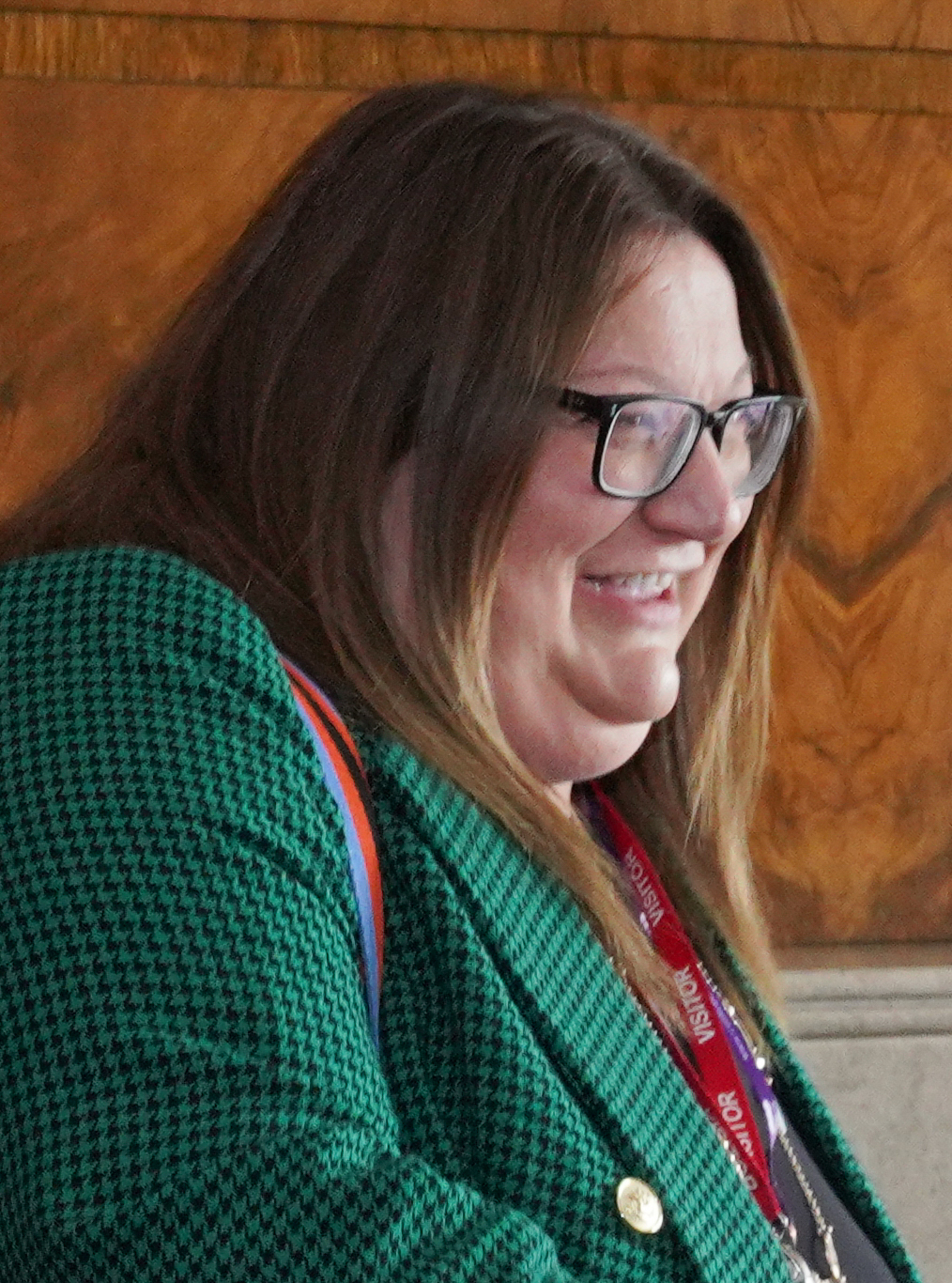
	First party	Second party	Third party
Leader	Tim Eagle (not standing for re-election)	Graham Leadbitter & Shona Morrison	John Divers
Party	Conservative	SNP	Labour
Leader's seat	Did not contest	Elgin City South & Fochabers Lhanbryde	Elgin City South
Last election	8 seats, 36.1%	9 seats, 31.6%	1 seats, 4.3%
Seats before	9	9	1
Seats won	11	8	3
Seat change	▲3	▼1	▲2
Popular vote	10,698	10,613	3,641
Percentage	36.2%	36.0%	12.3%
Swing	▲0.1%	▲4.4%	▲8.0%
	Fourth party	Fifth party	Sixth party
Leader	Various	Christopher Thomas Price	Lisa Mead & Fabio Villani
Party	Independent	Liberal Democrats	Green
Leader's seat	Various	Buckie	Did not contest
Last election	8 seats, 24.1%	0 seats, 1.2%	0 seats, 2.6%
Seats before	7	0	0
Seats won	2	1	1
Seat change	▼6	▲1	▲1
Popular vote	2,327	1,121	1,001
Percentage	7.9%	3.8%	3.4%
Swing	▼16.2%	▲2.6%	▲0.8%
- Results of the 2022 Moray Council election by wards.

Leader before election
Graham Leadbitter (SNP)
No overall control
Co-leaders after election
Neil McLennan & Kathleen Robertson (Con)
No overall control

Elections to Moray Council took place on 5 May 2022, on the same day as the 31 other Scottish local government elections. As with other Scottish council elections, it was held using single transferable vote (STV) – a form of proportional representation – in which multiple candidates are elected in each ward and voters rank candidates in order of preference.

The Conservatives were returned as the largest party on the council for the first time, returning 11 seats out of 26 – three short of an overall majority. The Scottish National Party (SNP) returned 8 seats – down 1 from 2017 and Labour won 3 seats – an increase of 2 from 2017. Independent candidates took 2 seats – a decline of 6 from 2017, and also their worst showing since the 1995 election. The Liberal Democrats and the Greens won 1 seat each – both an increase of 1 from 2017.

Following the election, it was announced that the council would be run by a minority Conservative group, alongside two independents, with councillors Neil McLennan and Kathleen Robertson becoming co-leaders of the council, and councillor Marc Macrae becoming convenor.

== Background ==
=== Previous election ===
At the previous election in 2017, the Scottish National Party (SNP) won the most seats on the council, forming the largest block, but were 5 seats short of a majority. The Conservatives won the next largest amount of seats, and increased their vote share by 18.6%, gaining 5 seats. Two Independent councillors lost their seats, and so did 2 Labour councillors. Following the result, a Conservative-Independent administration was formed, with independent councillor George Alexander being appointed council leader. However, in May 2018, the Conservative-Independent administration collapsed after several members of the administration walked away. One month later, the SNP group formed a minority administration, following negotiations with other groups.

2017 Moray Council election result
Party	Seats	Vote share
SNP	9	31.6%
Conservative	8	36.1%
Independent	8	24.1%
Labour	1	4.3%

=== Electoral system ===
The election used the 8 wards created following the fifth statutory review of electoral arrangements conducted by Local Government Boundary Commission for Scotland in 2016, with 26 councillors elected. Each ward elected either three or four councillors, using the single transferable vote (STV) electoral system – a form of proportional representation – where candidates are ranked in order of preference.

=== Composition ===
There were two by-elections during the 2017-22 term. One by-election was held in the Elgin City North ward in May 2017, which resulted in a Conservative gain from independent. The other by-election was held in the Keith and Cullen ward in October 2019, which also resulted in a Conservative gain from independent. One Conservative councillor left the Conservative group in October 2017, he sat as an independent for the remainder of the term.

Composition of Moray Council
Party	2017 election	Dissolution
SNP	9	9
Conservative	8	9
Independent	8	7
Labour	1	1

=== Retiring Councillors ===
Retiring councillors
Council Ward	Party	Retiring Councillor
Speyside Glenlivet	Independent	Walter Wilson
Speyside Glenlivet	SNP	Louise Laing
Keith and Cullen	Conservative	Laura Powell
Buckie	Conservative	Tim Eagle
Buckie	Independent	Gordon Cowie
Heldon and Laich	SNP	Amy Patience
Heldon and Laich	Independent	Ryan Edwards
Elgin City North	Conservative	Frank Brown
Elgin City North	Conservative	Moira McLean
Elgin City South	Conservative	Ray McLean
Forres	SNP	Aaron McLean
Forres	Conservative	Claire Feaver
Forres	Independent	George Alexander
Forres	Independent	Lorna Creswell

=== Candidates ===
The total number of candidates fell from 45 in 2017 to 42. Unlike in 2017, the Conservatives stood the most candidates, standing 11, an increase of 3, while the SNP stood 4 less candidates compared to 2017 at 9. The number of independent candidates fell sharply, with only 6 independents standing, compared to 17 in 2017. Liberal Democrats also stood 6 candidates, an increase of 3, while Labour stood 5, also an increase of 3. The Greens stood 3, an increase of 1, and the Scottish Family Party and the Sovereignty Party also stood 1 candidate each.

== Results ==
2022 Moray Council election result
Party	Seats	Gains	Losses	Net gain/loss	Seats %	Votes %	Votes	+/−
Conservative	11	3	0	▲3	42.3	36.2	10,698	▲0.1
SNP	8	0	1	▼1	30.8	36.0	10,613	▲4.4
Labour	3	2	0	▲2	11.5	12.3	3,641	▲8.0
Independent	2	0	6	▼6	7.7	7.9	2,327	▼16.2
Liberal Democrats	1	1	0	▲1	3.9	3.8	1,121	▲2.6
Green	1	1	0	▲1	3.9	3.4	1,001	▲0.8
Scottish Family	0	0	0	Steady	0.0	0.3	99	New
Sovereignty	0	0	0	Steady	0.0	0.1	23	New
Total	26						29,523	

=== Ward summary ===
Results of the 2022 Moray Council election by ward
Ward	%	Seats	%	Seats	%	Seats	%	Seats	%	Seats	%	Seats	Total
Ward	Con		SNP		Lab		Lib Dem		Grn		Others		Total
Speyside Glenlivet	33.8	1	36.8	1					8.6	0	20.8	1	3
Keith and Cullen	43.7	2	43.5	1			9.9	0			2.9	0	3
Buckie		1		1				1					3
Fochabers Lhanbryde	39.8	1	43.0	1	10.1	1							3
Heldon and Laich	39.7	2	29.5	1	7.7	0	4.6	0			18.5	1	4
Elgin City North	25.9	1	32.6	1	28.5	1	3.9	0	4.5	0	4.6	0	3
Elgin City South	26.8	1	35.6	1	28.1	1	3.1	0			6.5	0	3
Forres	40.9	2	34.3	1	10.6	0			9.1	1	5.1	0	4
Total	36.2	11	36.0	8	12.3	3	3.8	1	3.4	1	8.3	2	26

=== Seats changing hands ===
Below is a list of seats which elected a different party or parties from 2017 in order to highlight the change in political composition of the council from the previous election. The list does not include defeated incumbents who resigned or defected from their party and subsequently failed re-election while the party held the seat.

Seats changing hands
Seat	2017		2022	
Seat	Party	Member	Party	Member
Keith and Cullen	Independent	Ron Shepherd	Conservative	Tracy Colyer
Buckie	Independent	Gordon Cowie	Liberal Democrats	Christopher Price
Fochabers Lhanbryde	SNP	David Bremner	Labour	Ben Williams
Heldon and Laich	Independent	Ryan Edwards	Conservative	Bridget Mustard
Elgin City North	Independent	Sandy Cooper	Labour	Sandy Keith
Forres	Independent	George Alexander	Conservative	Paul McBain
Forres	Independent	Lorna Creswell	Greens	Draeyk Van der Horn

== Ward results ==
=== Speyside Glenlivet ===
The SNP, the Conservatives and the independent candidate Derek Ross retained the seats they had won at the previous election.

Speyside Glenlivet - 3 seats
Party	Candidate	FPv%	Count		
Party	Candidate	FPv%	1	2	3
SNP	Juli Harris	36.8	1,227		
Conservative	David Gordon	33.8	1,129		
Independent	Derek Ross (incumbent)	20.1	672	750	898
Green	Elidh Myrvang Brown	8.6	286	492	520
Sovereignty	David Philip McHutchon	0.7	23	31	51
Electorate: 7,382 Valid: 3,374 Spoilt: 37 Quota: 835 Turnout: 45.7%

=== Keith and Cullen ===
The SNP (1), and the Conservatives (2) retained the seats they had won at the previous election.

Keith and Cullen - 3 seats
Party	Candidate	FPv%	Count				
Party	Candidate	FPv%	1	2	3	4	5
SNP	Theresa Coull (incumbent)	43.5	1,493				
Conservative	Donald Gatt (incumbent)	24.7	849	884			
Conservative	Tracy Colyer	18.9	650	674	694	733	955
Liberal Democrats	Leslie Tarr	9.9	341	589	592	674	
Scottish Family	William Barclay	2.9	99	178	178		
Electorate: 8,102 Valid: 3,432 Spoilt: 37 Quota: 859 Turnout: 45.7%

=== Buckie ===
The SNP and the Conservatives retained the seats they had won at the previous election, while the Liberal Democrats gained the seat won by an independent candidate at the previous election.

Buckie – 3 seats
Party	Candidate	Votes	%
Conservative	Neil McLannan	Unopposed	
Liberal Democrats	Christopher Thomas Price	Unopposed	
SNP	Sonya Warren (incumbent)	Unopposed	
Registered electors			

=== Fochabers Lhanbryde ===
The Conservatives retained the seat they had won at the previous election, while the SNP retained won of the two seats they had at the previous election while Labour gained one from the SNP.

Fochabers Lhanbryde - 3 seats
Party	Candidate	FPv%	Count				
Party	Candidate	FPv%	1	2	3	4	5
Conservative	Marc Macrae (incumbent)	39.7	1,590				
SNP	Shona Morrison (incumbent)	23.5	940	959	1,005		
SNP	David Bremner (incumbent)	19.4	778	792	812	816	
Labour	Ben Williams	10.1	404	535	831	831	1,178
Liberal Democrats	Donald Cameron	7.0	284	496			
Electorate: 8,253 Valid: 3,996 Spoilt: 68 Quota: 1,000 Turnout: 49.2%

=== Heldon and Laich ===
The SNP, and the Conservatives, and the independent candidate John Cowe retained the seats they had won at the previous election, while the Conservatives also gained one from an independent.

Heldon and Laich - 4 seats
Party	Candidate	FPv%	Count					
Party	Candidate	FPv%	1	2	3	4	5	6
SNP	Neil Cameron	29.5	1,455					
Conservative	James Allan (incumbent)	27.0	1,331					
Independent	John Cowe (incumbent)	18.5	914	1,045				
Conservative	Bridget Mustard	12.7	629	639	885	898	947	1,150
Labour	Andrew O'Neill	7.7	404	489	512	526	725	
Liberal Democrats	Calum Cameron	4.6	228	307	326	337		
Electorate: 10,794 Valid: 4,936 Spoilt: 60 Quota: 988 Turnout: 46.3%

=== Elgin City North ===
The SNP and the Conservatives retained the seats they had won at the previous election, while Labour gained one seat from an independent.

Elgin City North - 3 seats
Party	Candidate	FPv%	Count
Party	Candidate	FPv%	1
SNP	Jérémie Fernandes	32.6	1,199
Labour	Sandy Keith	28.5	1,048
Conservative	Amber Dunbar	25.9	952
Independent	Graham Jarvis	4.6	170
Green	Rebecca Kail	4.5	165
Liberal Democrats	Neil Alexander	3.9	144
Electorate: 9,228 Valid: 3,678 Spoilt: 32 Quota: 920 Turnout: 40.2%

=== Elgin City South ===
The SNP, Labour, and the Conservatives retained the seats they had won at the previous election.

Elgin City South - 3 seats
Party	Candidate	FPv%	Count
Party	Candidate	FPv%	1
SNP	Graham Leadbitter (incumbent)	35.5	1,444
Labour	John Divers (incumbent)	28.1	1,142
Conservative	Peter Bloomfield	26.8	1,090
Independent	Michaela French	4.0	161
Liberal Democrats	Bernard Salmon	3.1	124
Independent	Paul Briggs	2.5	101
Electorate: 10,149 Valid: 4,062 Spoilt: 51 Quota: 1,016 Turnout: 40.5%

=== Forres ===
The SNP, and the Conservatives retained the seats they had won at the previous election, while the Conservatives and the Greens also gained one seat from an independent each.

Forres - 4 seats
Party	Candidate	FPv%	Count					
Party	Candidate	FPv%	1	2	3	4	5	6
SNP	Scott Lawrence	34.3	2,077					
Conservative	Kathleen Robertson	25.0	1,516					
Conservative	Paul McBain	15.9	962	991	1,240			
Labour	James Hynam	10.6	643	830	845	852	1,001	
Green	Draeyk Van der Horn	9.1	550	928	933	934	1,047	1,514
Independent	Shaun Moat	5.1	309	403	417	424		
Electorate: 12,511 Valid: 6,128 Spoilt: 71 Quota: 1,212 Turnout: 49.0%

== Aftermath ==
Both the SNP and Conservative groups fell short of the required 14 seats for a majority. As such negotiations took place after the election to see who would form the next administration. Council leader before the election Elgin City South SNP councillor Graham Leadbitter proposed the continuation of the previous SNP minority administration but the council instead voted 12 to 8 to approve a minority Conservative administration, co-led by Buckie Conservative councillor Neil McLennan and Forres Conservative councillor Kathleen Robertson.

In July 2022, Buckie Conservative councillor Neil McLennan left the Conservative grouping on the council after being removed as joint group leader in a secret vote.

In August 2022, Heldon and Laich Conservative councillor James Allan left the Conservative grouping on the council, and now sits as a "non-aligned Conservative."

In May 2024, Buckie SNP councillor John Stuart left the SNP group on the council to sit as an independent. In December 2025, he joined the Greens.

=== Buckie by-election ===
In August 2022, the sole Liberal Democrat councillor Christopher Price resigned after only 109 days in the job. A by-election was held in the Buckie ward on 3 November 2022, and was won by SNP candidate John Stuart.

Buckie by-election (3 November 2022) - 1 seat
Party	Candidate	FPv%	Count			
Party	Candidate	FPv%	1	2	3	4
SNP	John Stuart	48.9	1,172	1,181	1,192	1,269
Conservative	Tim Eagle	36.7	879	884	904	989
Labour	Keighley Goldie	10.0	239	247	276	
Liberal Democrats	Les Tarr	2.8	67	78		
Independent	Neil Houlden	1.6	38			
Electorate: 8,139 Valid: 2,395 Spoilt: 13 Quota: 1,199 Turnout: 29.6%

=== Elgin City South by-election ===
In July 2024, SNP councillor Graham Leadbitter was elected to be the MP for the Moray West, Nairn and Strathspey constituency at the 2024 United Kingdom general election and decided to resign as a councillor on 14 August 2024. A by-election was held in the Elgin City South ward on 7 November 2024, and was won by Conservative candidate Elaine Kirby.

Elgin City South by-election (7 November 2024) - 1 seat
Party	Candidate	FPv%	Count		
Party	Candidate	FPv%	1	2	3
SNP	Laura Mitchell	32.2	849	928	1,093
Conservative	Elaine Kirby	31.6	834	962	1,160
Labour	Catriona McBain	18.5	487	615	
Liberal Democrats	Neil Alexander	17.7	466		
Electorate: 10,355 Valid: 2,636 Spoilt: 33 Quota: 1,319 Turnout: 25.8%
