= Speyside Glenlivet (ward) =

Electoral ward of Moray, Scotland

Coordinates: 57.4172°N 3.2448°W

Location of the ward in Moray

Speyside Glenlivet is one of the eight wards used to elect members of the Moray Council. There are 3 councillors for the area.

== History ==
After the 2023 Periodic Review of Westminster constituencies, the ward will move from Moray to the new Moray West, Nairn and Strathspey constituency.

== Councillors ==
Election	Councillors		
2007	Mike McConnachie (SNP)	Pearl Paul (SNP)	Fiona Murdoch (Independent)
2012	Mike McConnachie (SNP)	Pearl Paul (SNP)	Fiona Murdoch (Independent)
2017	Walter Wilson (Conservative)	Louise Laing (SNP)	Derek Ross (Independent)
2022	David Gordon (Conservative)	Juli Harris (SNP)	Derek Ross (Independent)

== Election results ==
=== 2022 election ===
Speyside Glenlivet - 3 seats
Party	Candidate	FPv%	Count		
Party	Candidate	FPv%	1	2	3
SNP	Juli Harris	36.8	1,227		
Conservative	David Gordon	33.8	1,129		
Independent	Derek Ross (incumbent)	20.1	672	750	898
Scottish Green	Elidh Myrvang Brown	8.6	286	492	520
Sovereignty	David Philip McHutchon	0.7	23	31	51
Electorate: 7,382 Valid: 3,374 Spoilt: 37 Quota: 835 Turnout: 45.7%

=== 2017 election ===
Speyside Glenlivet – 3 Seats
Party	Candidate	FPv%	Count			
Party	Candidate	FPv%	1	2	3	4
Conservative	Walter Wilson	35.9	1,307			
Independent	Derek Ross	23.6	858	1,107		
SNP	Louise Laing	21.3	776	782	821	1,458
SNP	Angus Anderson	19.2	698	705	727	
Electorate: 7,365 Valid: 3,639 Spoilt: 77 Quota: 910 Turnout: 50.5%

=== 2012 election ===
Speyside Glenlivet – 3 seats
Party	Candidate	FPv%	Count		
Party	Candidate	FPv%	1	2	3
Independent	Fiona Murdoch (incumbent)	27.6	771		
SNP	Pearl Paul (incumbent)	27.2	759		
SNP	Mike McConnachie (incumbent)	22.9	639	657	706
Conservative	David Gambles	13.5	376	393	395
UKIP	Matthew Desmond	5.7	160	168	170
UKIP	Don Gatt	3.2	89	96	98
Electorate: 7,059 Valid: 2,794 Spoilt: 40 Quota: 699 Turnout: 39.6%

=== 2007 election ===
Speyside Glenlivet- 3 Seats
Party	Candidate	FPv%	Count					
Party	Candidate	FPv%	1	2	3	4	5	6
SNP	Pearl Paul	29.2	1,107					
SNP	Mike McConnachie	23.2	881	974				
Conservative	Gordon Henderson	17.3	658	665	668	711	801	
Independent	Fiona Murdoch	15.1	571	583	589	617	862	1,259
Independent	Adrina Taylor	12.2	462	477	480	493		
UKIP	Matthew Desmond	3.1	116	118	120			
Valid: 3,795 Spoilt: 90 Quota: 949 Turnout: 55.7%
