= 1984 Moray District Council election =

1984 Moray Council District Election

- 3 May 1984

All 18 seats to Moray District Council 10 seats needed for a majority
	First party	Second party	Third party
Party	Independent	SNP	Labour
Last election	15 seats, 64.0%	3 seats, 36.0%	Did not contest
Seats won	15	2	1
Seat change	Steady	▼1	▲1
Popular vote	7,154	1,047	630
Percentage	81.0%	11.9%	7.1%
Swing	▲17.0%	▼24.1%	New
- Map of ward results

- Council composition following the election

Elections to Moray District Council were held on 3 May 1984, on the same day as the other Scottish local government elections. This was the fourth election to the district council following the implementation of the Local Government (Scotland) Act 1973.

The election used the 18 wards created by the Initial Statutory Reviews of Electoral Arrangements in 1980. Each ward elected one councillor using first-past-the-post voting.

Moray remained a non-partisan district. The first Labour councillor to ever sit on the Moray District Council was elected at this election.

== Background ==
At the previous election in 1980 to Moray District Council independents took the vast majority of seats.

1980 Moray District Council election results
Party	Seats	Vote share
Independent	15	64.0%
SNP	3	36.0%

== Results ==
1984 Moray District Council election result
Party	Seats	Gains	Losses	Net gain/loss	Seats %	Votes %	Votes	+/−
Independent	15	2	2	Steady	83.3	81.0	7154	▲17.0
SNP	2	1	2	▼1	11.1	11.9	1047	▼24.1
Labour	1	1	0	▲1	5.6	7.1	630	New

== Ward results ==
=== Bishopmill ===
Party	Candidate	Votes	%
Independent	A Anderson (Incumbent)	696	73.0
Independent	N Baird	258	27.0
Majority		438	46.0
Turnout		954	25.5
Independent gain from SNP			

=== Cathedral ===
Party	Candidate	Votes	%
Labour	A Farquharson	630	53.2
Independent	J Russell (Incumbent)	551	46.5
Majority		79	6.7
Turnout		1,181	30.2
Labour gain from Independent			

=== New Elgin ===
Party	Candidate	Votes	%
Independent	Roma Hossack (Incumbent)	Unopposed	
Independent hold			

=== Central West ===
Party	Candidate	Votes	%
Independent	H Proctor	Unopposed	
Independent hold			

=== Forres ===
Party	Candidate	Votes	%
Independent	A Slorach (Incumbent)	Unopposed	
Independent hold			

=== Findhorn Valley ===
Party	Candidate	Votes	%
Independent	R Cochrane	Unopposed	
Independent hold			

=== Laich ===
Party	Candidate	Votes	%
Independent	D Thomson (Incumbent)	Unopposed	
Independent hold			

=== Lossiemouth ===
Party	Candidate	Votes	%
Independent	R Murdoch	918	54.3
Independent	M Hancock	770	45.5
Majority		148	8.8
Turnout		1,688	41.7
Independent hold			

=== Heldon ===
Party	Candidate	Votes	%
Independent	H Mustard	Unopposed	
Independent hold			

=== Innes ===
Party	Candidate	Votes	%
Independent	J Shaw	783	62.8
Independent	C Gray	291	23.3
Independent	P Jappy	172	13.8
Majority		492	39.5
Turnout		1,247	33.6
Independent hold			

=== Buckie West ===
Party	Candidate	Votes	%
SNP	Hamish Watt	634	58.8
Independent	J Cole (Incumbent)	444	41.1
Majority		190	17.7
Turnout		1,079	35.0
SNP gain from Independent			

=== Buckie East ===
Party	Candidate	Votes	%
SNP	F Anderson (Incumbent)	Unopposed	
SNP hold			

=== Rathford ===
Party	Candidate	Votes	%
Independent	G Innes (Incumbent)	Unopposed	
Independent hold			

=== Lennox ===
Party	Candidate	Votes	%
Independent	T Howe (Incumbent)	Unopposed	
Independent gain from SNP			

=== Keith ===
Party	Candidate	Votes	%
Independent	Len Mann (Incumbent)	887	56.0
Independent	William Ettles	694	43.8
Majority		193	12.2
Turnout		1,584	48.5
Independent hold			

=== Strathisla ===
Party	Candidate	Votes	%
Independent	William Percy Watt (Incumbent)	Unopposed	
Independent hold			

=== Speyside ===
Party	Candidate	Votes	%
Independent	Edward Aldridge (Incumbent)	Unopposed	
Independent hold			

=== Glenlivet ===
Party	Candidate	Votes	%
Independent	M Marshall	690	62.4
SNP	I Murray	413	37.4
Majority		277	25.0
Turnout		1,105	41.0
Independent hold			
