= 2017 Moray Council election =

2017 Scottish local government election

- 4 May 2017

All 26 seats to Moray Council 14 seats needed for a majority
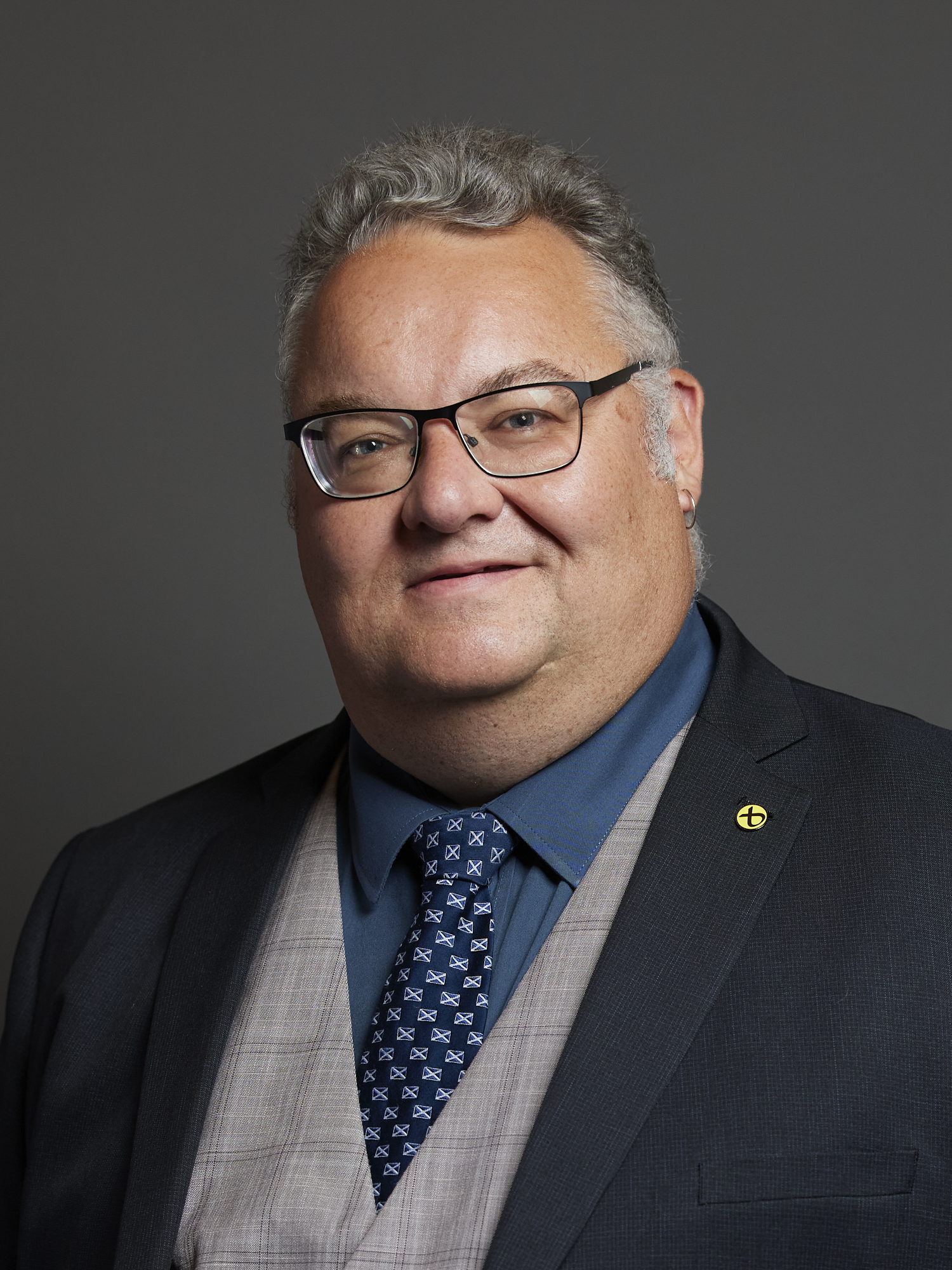

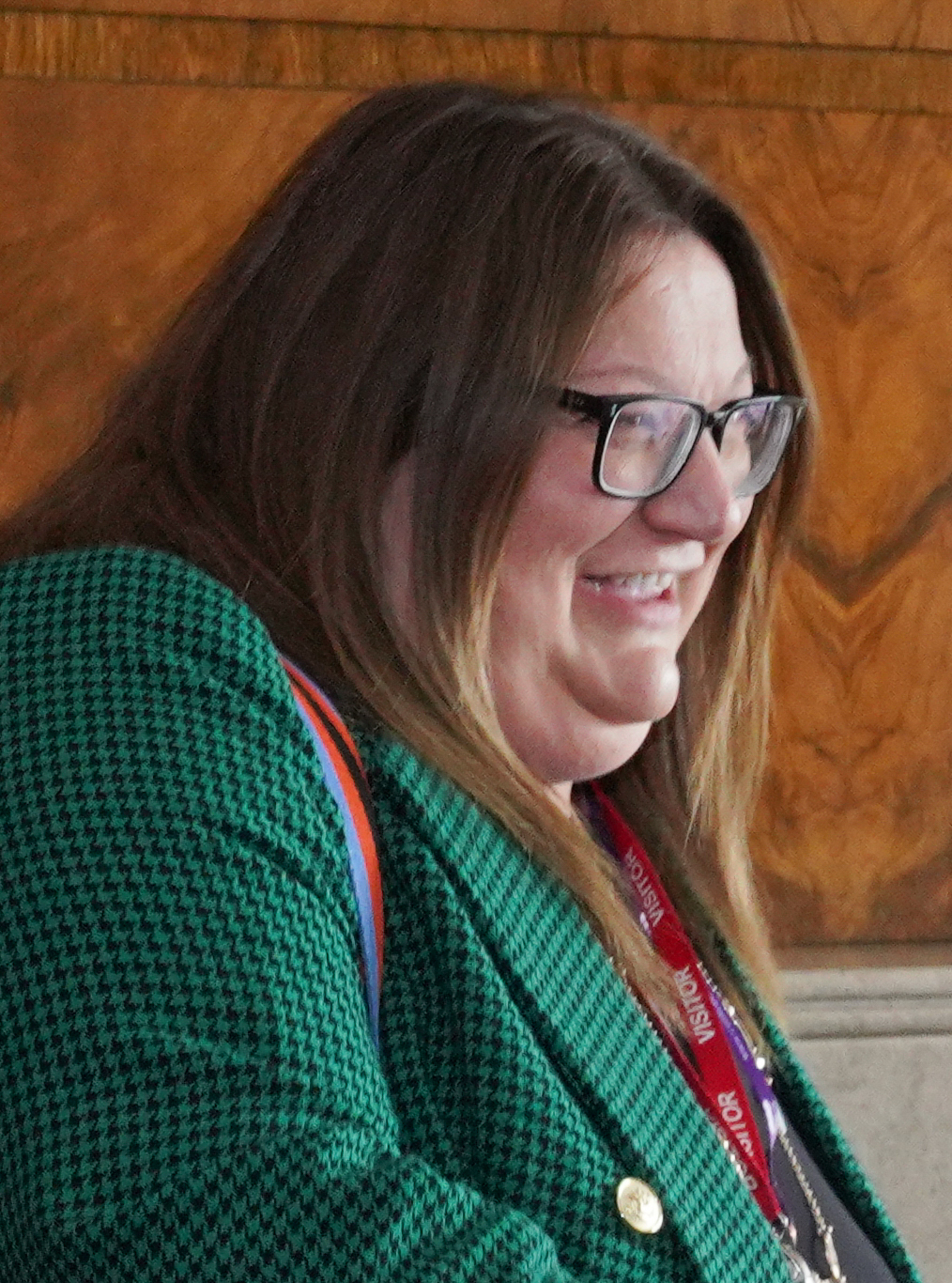

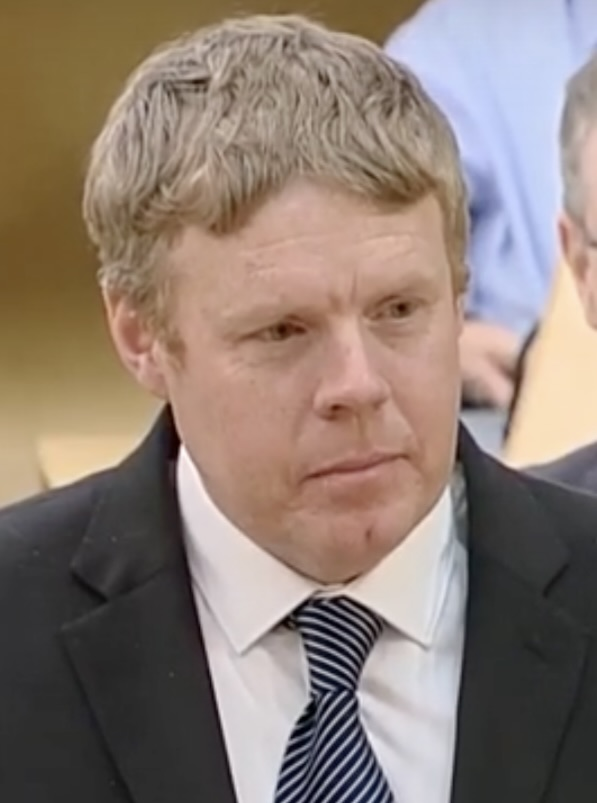
	First party	Second party
Leader	Graham Leadbitter & Shona Morrison	Tim Eagle
Party	SNP	Conservative
Leader's seat	Elgin South & Fochabers Lhanbryde	Buckie
Last election	10 seats, 39.4%	3 seats, 17.5%
Seats before	11	10
Seats won	9	8
Seat change	▼1	▲5
Popular vote	10,518	12,010
Percentage	31.6%	36.1%
Swing	▼7.9%	▲18.6%
	Third party	Fourth party
Leader	George Alexander	John Divers
Party	Independent	Labour
Leader's seat	Forres	Elgin City South
Last election	10 seats, 28.8%	3 seats, 9.2%
Seats before	3	2
Seats won	8	1
Seat change	▼2	▼2
Popular vote	8,022	1,483
Percentage	24.1%	4.3%
Swing	▼4.8%	▼4.9%
- The 8 multi-member wards

Leader before election
Stewart Cree (Ind)
No overall control
Leader after election
George Alexander (Ind)
No overall control

Elections to Moray Council took place on 4 May 2017, on the same day as the 31 other Scottish local government elections. The election used the eight wards created under the Local Governance (Scotland) Act 2004, with 26 Councillors being elected. Each ward elected either 3 or 4 members, using the STV electoral system - a form of proportional representation.

The Scottish National Party (SNP) were returned as the largest party on the council again, returning 9 seats out of 26 – a decline of 1 from 2012, and 5 short of an overall majority. The Conservatives returned 8 seats – an increase of 5. Independent candidates took 8 seats – a decline of 2. Labour returned 1 seat – a decline of 2 from 2017.

Following the election, a Conservative-Independent coalition administration was formed, with independent councillor George Alexander appointed Leader of the council, while Conservative councillor James Allan was appointed Convenor of the Moray Council.

== Background ==
=== Previous election ===
At the previous election in 2012, the Scottish National Party saw their seat count increase by 1, and became the largest grouping on the council by vote share. The Independent group lost 2 seats and the Conservatives held all of their seats. Labour increased their representation on the council by 1. Due to the SNP not having enough seats to form an administration, the previous coalition between the Conservatives and the Independents group stayed as the Council's administration.

2012 Moray Council election result
Party	Seats	Vote share
SNP	10	39.4%
Independent	10	28.8%
Conservative	3	17.5%
Labour	3	9.2%

=== Composition ===
There were 5 by-elections in the 2012-17 term. There were 2 by-elections in the Heldon & Laich ward: one resulted in an independent gain from SNP, and the other was an independent hold. There were 2 further by-elections in the Buckie ward: one resulted in an SNP gain from Independent, and the other resulted in an independent hold. The other by-election was held in the Elgin City North ward, which resulted in an SNP gain from Labour.

Composition of Moray Council
Party	2012 election	Dissolution
SNP	10	11
Independent	10	3
Conservative	3	10
Labour	3	2

== Results ==
2017 Moray Council election result
Party	Seats	Gains	Losses	Net gain/loss	Seats %	Votes %	Votes	+/−
SNP	9	0	1	▼1	34.6	31.6	10,518	▼7.8
Conservative	8	5	0	▲5	30.8	36.1	12,010	▲18.6
Independent	8	0	2	▼2	30.8	24.1	8,022	▼4.8
Labour	1	0	2	▼2	3.8	4.3	1,438	▼4.9
Green	0	0	0	Steady	0.0	2.6	853	▼0.2
Liberal Democrats	0	0	0	Steady	0.0	1.2	410	▲0.6
Total	26						33,296	

Note: "Votes" are the first preference votes. The net gain/loss and percentage changes relate to the result of the previous Scottish local elections in 2012. This may differ from other published sources showing gain/loss relative to seats held at dissolution of Scotland's councils.

== Ward results ==
=== Speyside Glenlivet ===
- 2012: 2 X SNP & 1 X Independent
- 2017: 1 X SNP, 1 X Conservative & 1 X Independent
- 2012-2017: Conservative gain one seat from SNP

Speyside Glenlivet – 3 Seats
Party	Candidate	FPv%	Count			
Party	Candidate	FPv%	1	2	3	4
Conservative	Walter Wilson	35.9	1,307			
Independent	Derek Ross	23.6	858	1,107		
SNP	Louise Laing	21.3	776	782	821	1,458
SNP	Angus Anderson	19.2	698	705	727	
Electorate: 7,365 Valid: 3,639 Spoilt: 77 Quota: 910 Turnout: 50.5%

=== Keith and Cullen ===
- 2012: 2 X Independent & 1 X SNP
- 2017: 1 X SNP, 1 X Conservative & 1 X Independent
- 2012-2017: Conservative gain one seat from Independent

Keith and Cullen – 3 Seats
Party	Candidate	FPv%	Count			
Party	Candidate	FPv%	1	2	3	4
Conservative	Donald Gatt	32.7	1,208			
SNP	Theresa Coull	29.5	1,088			
Independent	Ron Shepherd (incumbent)	18.02	665	765	783	1,069
SNP	Iain Grieve	10.2	375	382	510	570
Independent	Rob Barsby	9.6	354	442	447	
Electorate: 8,118 Valid: 3,690 Spoilt: 62 Quota: 923 Turnout: 46.2%

=== Buckie ===
- 2012: 2 X Independent & 1 X SNP
- 2017: 1 X SNP, 1 X Conservative & 1 X Independent
- 2012-2017: Conservative gain one seat from Independent

Buckie – 3 seats
Party	Candidate	FPv%	Count			
Party	Candidate	FPv%	1	2	3	4
Conservative	Tim Eagle	33.8	1,060			
Independent	Gordon Cowie (incumbent)	21.4	673	826		
SNP	Sonya Warren (incumbent)	22.8	716	728	734	1,369
SNP	Gordon McDonald (incumbent)	22.0	691	702	710	
Electorate: 7,962 Valid: 3,140 Spoilt: 47 Quota: 786 Turnout: 40.0%

=== Fochabers Lhanbryde ===
- 2012: 1 X SNP, 1 X Conservative & 1 X Labour
- 2017: 2 X SNP & 1 X Conservative
- 2012-2017: SNP gain one seat from Labour

Fochabers Lhanbryde – 3 seats
Party	Candidate	FPv%	Count						
Party	Candidate	FPv%	1	2	3	4	5	6	7
Conservative	Marc Macrae	42.7	1,747						
SNP	Shona Morrison	16.7	682	702	708	738	759	794	872
SNP	David Bremner	17.4	711	722	729	752	760	792	862
Independent	Ian Taylor	6.7	274	361	374	441	578	701	
Liberal Democrats	Donald Cameron	5.2	211	318	394	445	511		
Independent	Kenneth Gillespie	4.1	166	282	294	344			
Independent	Sean Morton (incumbent)	5.3	215	284	289				
Liberal Democrats	Peter Horton	2.0	83	142					
Electorate: 8,089 Valid: 4,089 Spoilt: 71 Quota: 1,023 Turnout: 51.4%

=== Heldon & Laich ===
- 2012: 2 X Independent, 1 X SNP & 1 X Conservative
- 2017: 2 X Independent, 1 X SNP & 1 X Conservative
- 2012-2017: No change

Heldon and Laich – 4 seats
Party	Candidate	FPv%	Count						
Party	Candidate	FPv%	1	2	3	4	5	6	7
Conservative	James Allan	37.9	1,953						
Independent	John Cowe (incumbent)	15.3	789	1,045					
SNP	Amy Patience	18.9	976	996	997	1,014	1,110		
Independent	Ryan Edwards	10.5	541	662	668	706.01	769	788	1,170
Independent	Dennis Slater (incumbent)	10.2	527	658	663	693	760	778	
Green	James Mackessack-Leitch	4.7	240	286.8	288	347			
Liberal Democrats	John Mitchell	2.3	116	201	201				
Electorate: 10,737 Valid: 5,142 Spoilt: 44 Quota: 1,029 Turnout: 48.3%

=== Elgin City North ===
- 2012: 2 X SNP & 1 X Labour
- 2017: 1 X SNP, 1 X Conservative & 1 X Independent
- 2012-2017: Conservative & Independent each gain one seat from SNP & Labour

Elgin City North – 3 seats
Party	Candidate	FPv%	Count					
Party	Candidate	FPv%	1	2	3	4	5	6
Conservative	Frank Brown	32.9	1,181					
Independent	Sandy Cooper	14.9	532	606	767	933		
SNP	Paula Coy	17.7	634	639	672	714	720	1,279
SNP	Patsy Gowans (incumbent)	15.0	537	540	557	630	634	
Labour	Nick Taylor	11.9	429	477	536			
Independent	Billy Adams	7.4	266	339				
Electorate: 9,237 Valid: 3,579 Spoilt: 65 Quota: 895 Turnout: 39.5%

=== Elgin City South ===
- 2012: 1 X SNP, 1 X Conservative & 1 X Labour
- 2017: 1 X SNP, 1 X Conservative & 1 X Labour
- 2012-2017: No change

Elgin City South – 3 seats
Party	Candidate	FPv%	Count	
Party	Candidate	FPv%	1	2
Conservative	Ray McLean	35.9	1,460	
SNP	Graham Leadbitter (incumbent)	30.7	1,245	
Labour	John Divers (incumbent)	24.8	1,009	1,126
Independent	Sean Malone	8.5	347	531
Electorate: 9,551 Valid: 4,061 Spoilt: 42 Quota: 1,016 Turnout: 43.0%

=== Forres ===
- 2012: 3 X Independent & 1 X SNP
- 2017: 2 X Independent, 1 X SNP & 1 X Conservative
- 2012-2017: Conservative gain from Independent

Forres - 4 seats
Party	Candidate	FPv%	Count						
Party	Candidate	FPv%	1	2	3	4	5	6	7
Conservative	Claire Feaver	35.4	2,094						
SNP	Aaron McLean (incumbent)	23.5	1,389						
Independent	George Alexander (incumbent)	16.6	981	1,247					
Green	Fabio Villani	10.4	613	671	767	773	778	835	
Independent	Lorna Creswell (incumbent)	9.4	555	739	779	815	841	1,015	1,505
Independent	Jeff Hamilton	4.1	243	335	349	360	381		
Independent	Terry Monaghan	0.6	36	54	60	62			
Electorate: 12,116 Valid: 5,911 Spoilt: 47 Quota: 1,183 Turnout: 49.2%

== Aftermath ==
Following the election, a Conservative-Independent coalition administration was formed. Independent councillor George Alexander was appointed Leader of the council, while Conservative councillor James Allan was appointed Convenor of the Moray Council.

However, in May 2018, all but one of the Conservative councillors left the administration, leaving the independents and Convenor James Allan in a minority administration. Following negotiations, in June 2018, Graham Leadbitter was appointed the role of Council Leader and Shona Morrison was appointed Convenor of the Moray Council, the first women to take on the role in Moray Council's history.

On 21 October 2017, Speyside Glenlivet Conservative councillor Walter Wilson resigned from the party group following disagreements with colleagues in the party group. He sat as an independent.

=== Elgin City North by-election ===
On 10 May 2017, independent councillor Sandy Cooper resigned his seat less than a week after being elected in the 2017 elections. A by-election was held in Elgin City North ward on 13 July 2017, and it was won by Conservative candidate Maria McLean.

Elgin City North by-election (13 July 2017) - 1 seat
Party	Candidate	FPv%	Count		
Party	Candidate	FPv%	1	2	3
Conservative	Maria McLean	40.0	923	970	1,061
SNP	Patsy Gowans	38.8	895	904	994
Labour	Nick Taylor	15.8	365	389	
Independent	Terry Monaghan	5.4	124		
Electorate: 9,354 Valid: 2,307 Spoilt: 17 Quota: 1,155 Turnout: 24.8%

=== Keith and Cullen by-election ===
On 24 October 2019, independent councillor Ron Shepherd retired due to ill-health. A by-election was held in the Keith and Cullen ward on 21 November 2019 and it was won by the Conservative candidate Laura Powell.

Keith and Cullen by-election (21 November 2019) - 1 seat
Party	Candidate	FPv%	Count		
Party	Candidate	FPv%	1	2	3
Conservative	Laura Powell	41.5	1,142	1,177	1,339
SNP	Jock McKay	38.1	1,047	1,077	1,184
Independent	Rob Barsby	12.7	349	430	
Liberal Democrats	Ian Aitchison	7.7	212		
Electorate: 8,191 Valid: 2,778 Spoilt: 28 Quota: 1,376 Turnout: 33.9%
