= Elgin City South (ward) =

Electoral ward in Moray, Scotland

Location of the ward

Elgin City South is one of the eight wards used to elect members of the Moray Council. It elects three Councillors.

== Councillors ==
| Election | Councillors | | |
|---|---|---|---|
| 2007 | Graham Leadbitter (SNP) | Alistair Bisset (Independent) | John Divers (Labour) |
| 2008 by | Graham Leadbitter (SNP) | John Sharp (SNP) | John Divers (Labour) |
| 2012 | Graham Leadbitter (SNP) | James Allan (Conservative) | John Divers (Labour) |
| 2017 | Graham Leadbitter (SNP) | Ray McLean (Conservative) | John Divers (Labour) |
| 2022 | Graham Leadbitter (SNP) | Peter Bloomfield (Conservative) | John Divers (Labour) |
| 2024 by | Elaine Kirby (Conservative) | Peter Bloomfield (Conservative) | John Divers (Labour) |

== Election results ==
=== 2024 by-election ===
In July 2024, SNP councillor Graham Leadbitter was elected to be the MP for the Moray West, Nairn and Strathspey constituency at the 2024 United Kingdom general election and decided to resign as a councillor on 14 August 2024. A by-election was held in the Elgin City South ward on 7 November 2024, and was won by Conservative candidate Elaine Kirby.

Elgin City South by-election (7 November 2024) - 1 seat
| Party | Candidate | FPv% | Count | | |
| Party | Candidate | FPv% | 1 | 2 | 3 |
|---|---|---|---|---|---|
| SNP | Laura Mitchell | 32.2 | 849 | 928 | 1,093 |
| Conservative | Elaine Kirby | 31.6 | 834 | 962 | 1,160 |
| Labour | Catriona McBain | 18.5 | 487 | 615 | |
| Liberal Democrats | Neil Alexander | 17.7 | 466 | | |
Electorate: 10,355 Valid: 2,636 Spoilt: 33 Quota: 1,319 Turnout: 25.8%

=== 2022 Election ===
Elgin City South - 3 seats
| Party | Candidate | FPv% | Count |
| Party | Candidate | FPv% | 1 |
|---|---|---|---|
| SNP | Graham Leadbitter (incumbent) | 35.5 | 1,444 |
| Labour | John Divers (incumbent) | 28.1 | 1,142 |
| Conservative | Peter Bloomfield | 26.8 | 1,090 |
| Independent | Michaela French | 4.0 | 161 |
| Liberal Democrats | Bernard Salmon | 3.1 | 124 |
| Independent | Paul Briggs | 2.5 | 101 |
Electorate: TBC Valid: 4,062 Spoilt: 51 Quota: 1,016 Turnout: 40.5%

=== 2017 Election ===
Elgin City South - 3 Seats
| Party | Candidate | FPv% | Count | |
| Party | Candidate | FPv% | 1 | 2 |
|---|---|---|---|---|
| Conservative | Ray McLean | 35.9 | 1,460 | |
| SNP | Graham Leadbitter (incumbent) | 30.7 | 1,245 | |
| Labour | John Divers (incumbent) | 24.8 | 1,009 | 1,126 |
| Independent | Sean Malone | 8.5 | 347 | 531 |
Electorate: 9,551 Valid: 4,061 Spoilt: 42 Quota: 1,016 Turnout: 43.0%

=== 2012 Election ===
Elgin City South - 3 seats
| Party | Candidate | FPv% | Count | |
| Party | Candidate | FPv% | 1 | 2 |
|---|---|---|---|---|
| Labour | John Divers (incumbent) | 37.6 | 1,073 | |
| Conservative | James Allan | 25.0 | 714 | 810 |
| SNP | Graham Leadbitter (incumbent) | 23.6 | 675 | 771 |
| SNP | John Sharp (incumbent) | 13.8 | 394 | 434 |
Electorate: 8,356 Valid: 2,856 Spoilt: 40 Quota: 715 Turnout: 34.2%

=== 2008 by-election ===
Elgin City South By-Election (February 14, 2008)- 1 seat
| Party | Candidate | FPv% | Count | | | | | | | | |
| Party | Candidate | FPv% | 1 | 2 | 3 | 4 | 5 | 6 | 7 | 8 | 9 |
|---|---|---|---|---|---|---|---|---|---|---|---|
| SNP | John Alexander Sharp | 32.1 | 670 | 670 | 672 | 672 | 679 | 685 | 706 | 763 | 884 |
| Independent | Hamish Simpson | 24.3 | 513 | 513 | 518 | 523 | 527 | 540 | 612 | 722 | 845 |
| Labour | Mark Cascarino | 17.0 | 358 | 358 | 361 | 363 | 370 | 380 | 403 | 459 | |
| Independent | James Scott Allan | 10.6 | 223 | 224 | 227 | 229 | 233 | 240 | 278 | | |
| Conservative | Frank Brown | 9.8 | 206 | 206 | 206 | 208 | 216 | 223 | | | |
| Liberal Democrats | Peter J Horton | 2.3 | 48 | 48 | 49 | 50 | 53 | | | | |
| Scottish Senior Citizens | Andy Anderson | 1.5 | 32 | 32 | 32 | 37 | | | | | |
| UKIP | Matthew Coughlan Desmond | 1.0 | 20 | 20 | 20 | | | | | | |
| Independent | Martyn Harris | 0.8 | 16 | 16 | | | | | | | |
| Independent | Gordon Davidson | 0.1 | 1 | | | | | | | | |
Electorate: 7,886 Valid: 2,087 Spoilt: 25 Quota: 1,044 Turnout: 2,112

=== 2007 Election ===
Elgin City South- 3 Seats
| Party | Candidate | FPv% | Count | |
| Party | Candidate | FPv% | 1 | 2 |
|---|---|---|---|---|
| SNP | Graham Leadbitter | 33.2 | 1,304 | |
| Labour | John Divers | 28.8 | 1,132 | |
| Independent | Alistair Bisset | 23.0 | 904 | 1,019 |
| Conservative | Dennis Thompson | 15.1 | 592 | 656 |
Valid: 3,932 Spoilt: 50 Quota: 984 Turnout: 50.7%
