= Graham Leadbitter =

British politician

Graham Leadbitter MP
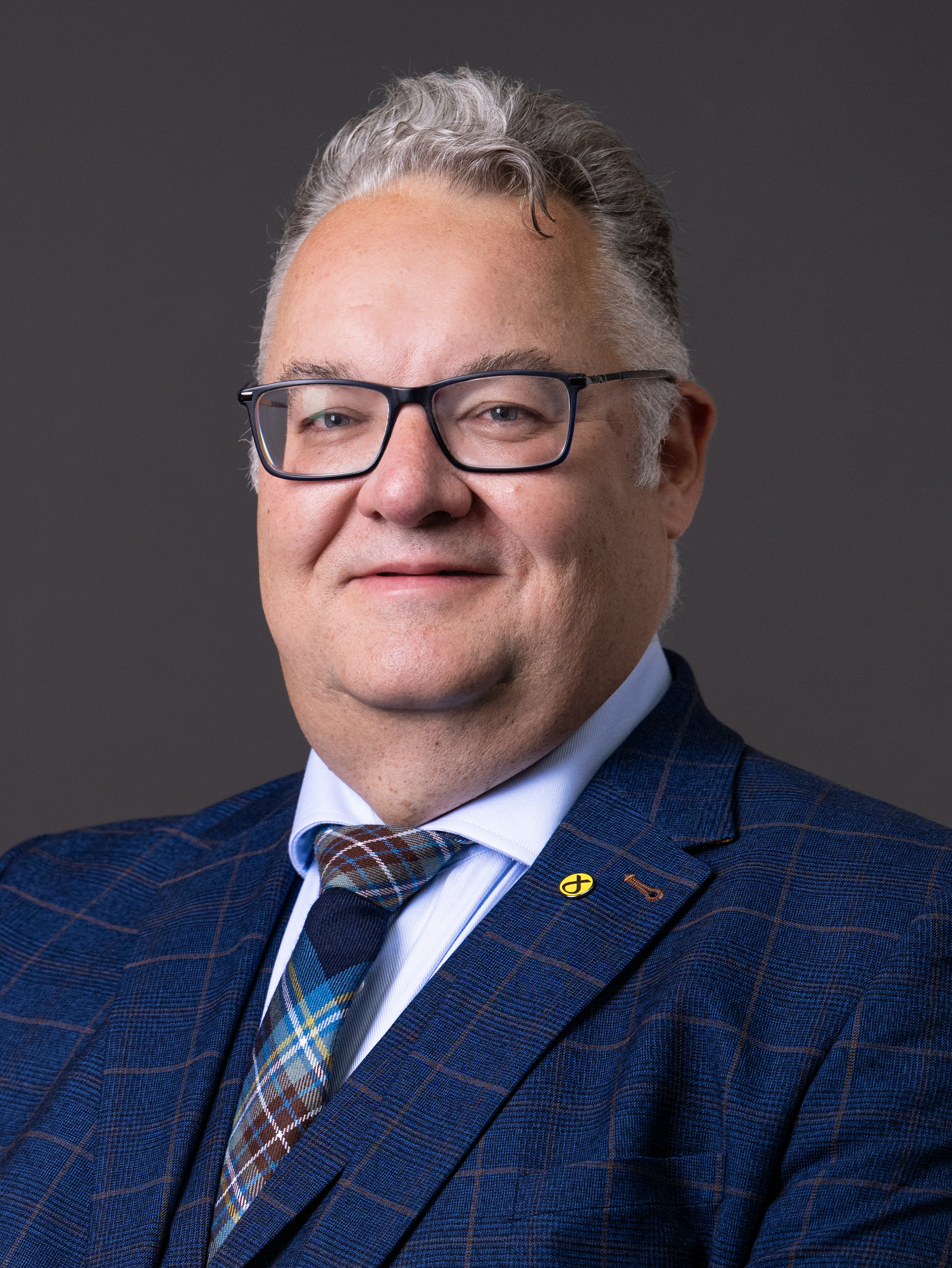
- Official portrait, 2026

Member of Parliament for Moray West, Nairn and Strathspey
- Incumbent
- Assumed office 4 July 2024
- Preceded by: Constituency created
- Majority: 1,001 (2.1%)

Personal details
- Party: Scottish National Party
- Education: Open University

Graham Leadbitter is a Scottish National Party (SNP) politician who has been the Member of Parliament (MP) for Moray West, Nairn and Strathspey in Scotland since the 2024 United Kingdom general election.

== Early life and career ==
Leadbitter was educated at Biggar High School, and studied computing at the Open University, where he received a diploma. Leadbitter worked as a constituency press officer for then-Moray MP Angus Robertson and Moray MSP Richard Lochhead from 2001 until 2007.

== Political career ==
Leadbitter was as a councillor for the Elgin City South ward on Moray Council at the 2007 local elections, and was re-elected in 2012, 2017 and 2022; he resigned in 2024. In 2017 he has made the co-leader of the SNP grouping on the council, and between 2018 and 2022 he served as council leader. From 2022 until 2024 he was a co-leader of the SNP opposition grouping on the council. Leadbitter was selected as the SNP candidate for the Moray West, Nairn and Strathspey constituency in October 2023, and was elected to Parliament at the 2024 general election. A by-election was held in the Elgin City South ward on 7 November 2024, and was won by Conservative candidate Elaine Kirby. After being elected in 2024, Leadbitter was selected to participate in the 2024-25 Armed Forces Parliamentary Scheme in the Royal Air Force. He currently serves as an Officer of the APPGs for Scotch Whisky and Space and also serves as Vice Chair of the Wood Panel Industry APPG.

Parliament of the United Kingdom
New constituency	Member of Parliament for Moray West, Nairn and Strathspey; 2024–present	Incumbent
