= Keith and Cullen (ward) =

Electoral ward in Moray, Scotland

Location of the ward in Moray

Keith and Cullen is one of the eight wards of the Moray Council. There are 3 councillors for the area.

== History ==
After the 2023 Periodic Review of Westminster constituencies, the ward will move from the Moray to the new Aberdeenshire North and Moray East constituency.

== Councillors ==
Election	Councillors		
2007	Stewart Cree (Independent)	Ron Shepherd (Independent)	Gary Coull (SNP)
2012	Stewart Cree (Independent)	Ron Shepherd (Independent)	Gary Coull (SNP)
2017	Donald Gatt (Conservative)	Ron Shepherd (Independent)	Theresa Coull (SNP)
2022	Donald Gatt (Conservative)	Tracy Colyer (Conservative)	Theresa Coull (SNP)

== Election results ==
=== 2022 election ===
Keith and Cullen - 3 seats
Party	Candidate	FPv%	Count				
Party	Candidate	FPv%	1	2	3	4	5
SNP	Theresa Coull (incumbent)	43.5	1,493				
Conservative	Donald Gatt (incumbent)	24.7	849	884.25			
Conservative	Tracy Colyer	18.9	650	673.8	694	733	955
Liberal Democrats	Leslie Tarr	9.9	341	589	592	674	
Scottish Family	William Barclay	2.9	99	178	178		
Electorate: TBC Valid: 3,432 Spoilt: 37 Quota: 859 Turnout: 45.7%

=== 2017 election ===
Keith and Cullen – 3 Seats
Party	Candidate	FPv%	Count			
Party	Candidate	FPv%	1	2	3	4
Conservative	Donald Gatt	32.7	1,208			
SNP	Theresa Coull	29.5	1,088			
Independent	Ron Shepherd (incumbent)	18.0	665	765	783	1,069
SNP	Iain Grieve	10.2	375	382	510	570
Independent	Rob Barsby	9.6	354	442	447	
Electorate: 8,118 Valid: 3,690 Spoilt: 62 Quota: 923 Turnout: 46.2%

=== 2012 election ===
Keith and Cullen – 3 seats
Party	Candidate	FPv%	Count				
Party	Candidate	FPv%	1	2	3	4	5
SNP	Gary Coull (incumbent)	42.5	1,319				
Independent	Ron Shepherd (incumbent)	22.6	702	751	867		
Independent	Stewart Cree (incumbent)	15.3	474	592	706	753	965
Conservative	Valery Dickson	10.0	312	336			
SNP	Hazel Thain	9.7	300	615	634	651	
Electorate: 7,810 Valid: 3,107 Spoilt: 33 Quota: 777 Turnout: 39.8%

=== 2007 election ===
Keith and Cullen- 3 Seats
Party	Candidate	FPv%	Count				
Party	Candidate	FPv%	1	2	3	4	5
SNP	Gary Coull	36.9	1,555				
Independent	Ron Shepherd	19.6	827	882	945	1,022	1,243
Independent	Stewart Cree	16.6	698	809	847	955	1,293
Independent	Percy Watt	13.8	582	657	701	786	
Liberal Democrats	Peter Matheson	7.1	300	366	411		
Conservative	Olive Starsmore	6.1	256	269			
Valid: 4,218 Spoilt: 55 Quota: 1,055 Turnout: 53.8%
