= Buckie (ward) =

Electoral ward in Moray, Scotland

Location of the ward

Buckie is one of the eight wards used to elect members of the Moray Council. It elects three Councillors.

== Councillors ==
Election	Councillors		
2007	Anne McKay (Independent)	Joe McKay (Independent)	Gordon McDonald (SNP)
2012	Anne McKay (Independent)	Joe McKay (Independent)	Gordon McDonald (SNP)
2014 by	Gordon Cowie (Independent)	Joe McKay (Independent)	Gordon McDonald (SNP)
2015 by	Gordon Cowie (Independent)	Sonya Warren (SNP)	Gordon McDonald (SNP)
2017	Gordon Cowie (Independent)	Sonya Warren (SNP)	Tim Eagle (Conservative)
2022	Christopher Price (Liberal Democrats)	Sonya Warren (SNP)	Neil McLennan (Independent)
2022 by	John Stuart (SNP)	Sonya Warren (SNP)	Neil McLennan (Independent)

== Election results ==
=== 2022 by-election ===
A by-election was called following Lib Dem councillor Christopher Price's resignation after just three months in the role.

Buckie by-election (3 November 2022) - 1 seat
Party	Candidate	FPv%	Count			
Party	Candidate	FPv%	1	2	3	4
SNP	John Stuart	48.7	1,172	1,181	1,192	1,269
Conservative	Tim Eagle	36.5	879	884	904	989
Labour	Keighly Goudie	9.9	239	247	276	
Liberal Democrats	Les Tarr	2.8	67	78		
Independent	Neil Houlden	1.6	38			
Electorate: 8,139 Valid: 2,395 Spoilt: 13 Quota: 1,199 Turnout: 29.6%

=== 2022 election ===
This election was uncontested because the number of candidates who stood was equal to the number of available seats. There are three seats in Buckie ward, and only three candidates' names were registered.

Buckie - 3 seats
Party	Candidate
Conservative	Neil McLennan
Liberal Democrat	Christopher Thomas Price
SNP	Sonya Warren (incumbent)

=== 2017 election ===
Buckie - 3 seats
Party	Candidate	FPv%	Count			
Party	Candidate	FPv%	1	2	3	4
Conservative	Tim Eagle	33.8	1,060			
Independent	Gordon Cowie (incumbent)	21.4	673	826		
SNP	Sonya Warren (incumbent)	22.8	716	728	734	1,369
SNP	Gordon McDonald (incumbent)	22.0	691	702	710	
Electorate: 7,962 Valid: 3,140 Spoilt: 47 Quota: 786 Turnout: 40.0%

=== 2015 by-election ===
Buckie by-election (26 March 2015) - 1 seat
Party	Candidate	FPv%	Count
Party	Candidate	FPv%	1
SNP	Sonya Warren	59.5	1,485
Independent	Norman Calder	27.9	696
Conservative	Tim Eagle	12.6	315
Electorate: 7,798 Valid: 2,496 Spoilt: 25 Quota: 1,249 Turnout: 32.3%

=== 2014 by-election ===
Buckie by-election (30 January 2014) - 1 seat
Party	Candidate	FPv%	Count		
Party	Candidate	FPv%	1	2	3
Independent	Gordon Cowie	43.9	830	907	1,034
SNP	Linda McDonald	35.5	670	679	710
Independent	Marc Macrae	11.7	220	248	
Conservative	Margaret Gambles	7.6	143		
Electorate: 7,872 Valid: 1,889 Spoilt: 26 Quota: 933 Turnout: 24.3%

=== 2012 election ===
Buckie - 3 seats
Party	Candidate	FPv%	Count			
Party	Candidate	FPv%	1	2	3	4
SNP	Gordon McDonald (incumbent)	38.4	967			
Independent	Anne McKay (incumbent)	25.7	648			
Independent	Joe Mackay (incumbent)	22.1	557	597	607	729
Conservative	Margaret Gambles	7.1	179	183	185	
SNP	Linda Scobie McDonald	6.7	169	449	452	458
Electorate: 7,336 Valid: 2,520 Spoilt: 39 Quota: 631 Turnout: 34.4%

=== 2007 election ===
Buckie- 3 Seats
Party	Candidate	FPv%	Count				
Party	Candidate	FPv%	1	2	3	4	5
SNP	Gordon McDonald	32.4	1,188				
Independent	Anne McKay	19.3	708	755	829	969	
Independent	Joe Mackay	19.0	698	755	790	902	927
Labour	John Leslie	13.8	507	551	573	622	631
Conservative	Ian Moir	10.8	397	413	436		
Independent	Bruce Smith	4.6	169	187			
Valid: 3,667 Spoilt: 66 Quota: 917 Turnout: 50.4%
