= 2007 Moray Council election =

2007 Scottish local government election

- 3 May 2007

All 26 seats to The Moray Council 14 seats needed for a majority
	First party	Second party
Party	Independent	SNP
Last election	16 seats, 49.3%	3 seats, 25.2%
Seats won	12	9
Seat change	▼4	▲6
Popular vote	12,535	11,942
Percentage	36.9%	35.2%
Swing	▼12.4%	▲10.0%
	Third party	Fourth party
Party	Conservative	Labour
Last election	1 seat, 4.3%	5 seats, 12.7%
Seats won	3	2
Seat change	▲2	▼3
Popular vote	5,374	2,945
Percentage	15.8%	8.7%
Swing	▲11.5%	▼4.0%
Council Leader before election
Gordon McDonald
Independent
Council Leader after election
Gordon McDonald
Independent

The 2007 Moray Council election was held on 3 May 2007, the same day as the Scottish Parliament election. The election was the first using the eight new wards created under the Local Governance (Scotland) Act 2004. 26 councillors were elected. Each ward elected either 3 or 4 members, using the STV electoral system. Previously there were single-member wards which used the first past the post electoral system.

The election resulted in a previously independent council becoming an independent/Conservative coalition, with a majority of four. The use of STV electoral system benefited the SNP and the Conservatives, with them gaining 6 and 2 seats respectively. It did not benefit Labour at all, which fell from second place in terms of seats to last. In addition, the Liberal Democrats lost their sole representative on the council

== Background ==
=== Previous election ===
The previous election in 2003 were the last to use the first-past-the-post voting system. At that election, independent won 16 seats - more than all the other groups combined.

2003 Moray Council election results
Party	Seats	Vote share
Independent	16	49.3%
Labour	5	12.7%
SNP	3	25.2%
Liberal Democrats	1	7.9%
Conservative	1	4.3%

=== Composition ===
There were 3 by-elections in the 2003-07 term. One by-election was held in the Buckie West ward and was an independent hold. The other two by-elections were held in the Speyside ward, one resulted in a SNP gain from independent, and the other resulted in an independent gain from SNP. As such the composition of the council did not change between 2003 and 2007.

Composition of Moray Council
Party	2003 election	Dissolution
Independent	16	16
Labour	5	5
SNP	3	3
Liberal Democrats	1	1
Conservative	1	1

== Results ==
2007 Moray Council election result
Party	Seats	Gains	Losses	Net gain/loss	Seats %	Votes %	Votes	+/−
Independent	12	-	-	▼4	46.2	36.9	12,535	▼12.4
SNP	9	-	-	▲6	34.6	35.2	11,942	▲10.0
Conservative	3	-	-	▲2	11.5	15.8	5,374	▲11.5
Labour	2	-	-	▼3	7.7	8.7	2,945	▼4.0
Liberal Democrats	0	-	-	▼1	0.0	1.7	587	▼6.2
Scottish Senior Citizens	0	-	-	Steady	0.0	1.3	438	New
UKIP	0	-	-	Steady	0.0	0.3	116	New
Total	26						33,938	

Note: "Votes" are the first preference votes. The net gain/loss and percentage changes relate to the result of the previous Scottish local elections on 1 May 2003. This may differ from other published sources showing gain/loss relative to seats held at dissolution of Scotland's councils.

== Ward results ==
=== Speyside Glenlivet ===
Speyside Glenlivet - 3 Seats
Party	Candidate	FPv%	Count					
Party	Candidate	FPv%	1	2	3	4	5	6
SNP	Pearl Paul	29.2	1,107					
SNP	Mike McConnachie	23.2	881	974				
Conservative	Gordon Henderson	17.3	658	665	668	711	801	
Independent	Fiona Murdoch	15.1	571	583	589	617	862	1,259
Independent	Adrina Taylor	12.2	462	477	480	493		
UKIP	Matthew Desmond	3.1	116	118	120			
Valid: 3,795 Spoilt: 90 Quota: 949 Turnout: 55.7%

=== Keith and Cullen ===
Keith and Cullen - 3 Seats
Party	Candidate	FPv%	Count				
Party	Candidate	FPv%	1	2	3	4	5
SNP	Gary Coull	36.9	1,555				
Independent	Ron Shepherd	19.6	827	882	945	1,022	1,243
Independent	Stewart Cree	16.6	698	809	847	955	1,293
Independent	Percy Watt	13.8	582	657	701	786	
Liberal Democrats	Peter Matheson	7.1	300	366	411		
Conservative	Olive Starsmore	6.1	256	269			
Valid: 4,218 Spoilt: 55 Quota: 1,055 Turnout: 53.8%

=== Buckie ===
Buckie - 3 Seats
Party	Candidate	FPv%	Count				
Party	Candidate	FPv%	1	2	3	4	5
SNP	Gordon McDonald	32.4	1,188				
Independent	Anne McKay	19.3	708	755	829	969	
Independent	Joe Mackay	19.0	698	755	790	902	927
Labour	John Leslie	13.8	507	551	573	622	631
Conservative	Ian Moir	10.8	397	413	436		
Independent	Bruce Smith	4.6	169	187			
Valid: 3,667 Spoilt: 66 Quota: 917 Turnout: 50.4%

=== Fochabers Lhanbryde ===
Fochabers Lhanbryde - 3 Seats
Party	Candidate	FPv%	Count								
Party	Candidate	FPv%	1	2	3	4	5	6	7	8	9
SNP	Anita McDonald	28.9	1,159								
Conservative	Douglas Ross	18.1	727	738	742	751	795	847	926	929	1,101
Independent	George McIntyre	15.1	608	623	630	640	675	826	1,017		
Labour	Lans Bangura	11.0	440	459	460	470	539	586	638	640	
Independent	Eddie Coutts	9.3	374	381	388	396	428	476			
Independent	Paul McBain	8.3	333	347	352	364	416				
Liberal Democrats	Peter Horton	7.2	287	310	314	319					
Independent	Gordon Davidson	1.4	56	61	67						
Independent	Alan Bodman	0.8	32	34							
Valid: 4,016 Spoilt: 45 Quota: 1,005 Turnout: 53.1%

=== Heldon & Laich ===
Heldon & Laich - 4 Seats
Party	Candidate	FPv%	Count								
Party	Candidate	FPv%	1	2	3	4	5	6	7	8	9
SNP	David Stewart	21.0	1,646								
Independent	Eric McGillivray	15.3	813	886	905	945	957	1,002	1,062		
Independent	John Hogg	14.0	744	781	787	797	810	844	941	952	1,099
Conservative	Allan Wright	11.4	606	634	640	645	653	671	726	730	799
Independent	Chris Tuke	10.0	531	564	594	607	615	635	677	688	
Independent	Harry Halkett	6.7	354	399	401	418	502	621			
Independent	Eric Paton	4.8	254	311	315	326	366				
Independent	Des Donaldson	2.9	155	196	203	215					
Independent	Martyn Harris	2.2	114	126	141						
Independent	Neil Hutchinson	1.7	92	104							
Valid: 5,309 Spoilt: 81 Quota: 1,062 Turnout: 54.4%

=== Elgin City North ===
Elgin City North - 3 Seats
Party	Candidate	FPv%	Count			
Party	Candidate	FPv%	1	2	3	4
SNP	Mike Shand	41.3	1,500			
Labour	Barry Jarvis	23.9	866	1,005		
Independent	John Russell	18.5	671	837	876	1,349
Conservative	Frank Brown	16.3	592	648	666	
Valid: 3,629 Spoilt: 46 Quota: 908 Turnout: 45.8%

=== Elgin City South ===
Elgin City South - 3 Seats
Party	Candidate	FPv%	Count	
Party	Candidate	FPv%	1	2
SNP	Graham Leadbitter	33.2	1,304	
Labour	John Divers	28.8	1,132	
Independent	Alistair Bisset	23.0	904	1,019
Conservative	Dennis Thompson	15.1	592	656
Valid: 3,932 Spoilt: 50 Quota: 984 Turnout: 50.7%

=== Forres ===
Forres - 4 Seats
Party	Candidate	FPv%	Count						
Party	Candidate	FPv%	1	2	3	4	5	6	7
SNP	Irene Ogilvie	29.8	1,602						
Conservative	Iain Young	28.8	1,546						
Independent	Jeff Hamilton	13.3	716	789	880	992	1,122		
Independent	Lee Bell	9.0	482	540	610	672	831	849	1,160
Scottish Senior Citizens	Thomas Anderson	8.2	438	549	615	653	719	726	
Independent	Pat Carroll	6.1	326	368	413	492			
Independent	Rick Walker	4.9	261	294	356				
Valid: 5,371 Spoilt: 129 Quota: 1,075 Turnout: 51.1%

== Aftermath ==
As no single political grouping on the council had enough seats to form a majority administration, the independent and Conservative groupings together formed a coalition.

=== Elgin City South by-election ===
On 14 February 2008, a by-election was held in the Elgin City South ward after the death of independent councillor Alistair Bisset. It was won by the SNP candidate John Sharp.

Elgin City South by-election (14 February 2008) - 1 seat
Party	Candidate	FPv%	Count								
Party	Candidate	FPv%	1	2	3	4	5	6	7	8	9
SNP	John Alexander Sharp	32.10	670	670	672	672	679	685	706	763	884
Independent	Hamish Simpson	24.3	513	513	518	523	527	540	612	722	845
Labour	Mark Cascarino	17.0	358	358	361	363	370	380	403	459	
Independent	James Scott Allan	10.6	223	224	227	229	233	240	278		
Conservative	Frank Brown	9.8	206	206	206	208	216	223			
Liberal Democrats	Peter J Horton	2.3	48	48	49	50	53				
Scottish Senior Citizens	Andy Anderson	1.5	32	32	32	37					
UKIP	Matthew Coughlan Desmond	1.0	20	20	20						
Independent	Martyn Harris	0.8	16	16							
Independent	Gordon Davidson	0.1	1								
Electorate: 7,886 Valid: 2,087 Spoilt: 25 Quota: 1,044 Turnout: 2,112

=== Forres by-election ===
On 11 November 2010, a by-election was held in the Forres ward after the retirement of Conservative councillor Iain Young. It was won by independent candidate Lorna Creswell.

Forres by-election (11 November 2010) - 1 seat
Party	Candidate	FPv%	Count							
Party	Candidate	FPv%	1	2	3	4	5	6	7	8
SNP	Aaron John McLean	24.1	773	774	789	800	837	899	950	1,045
Independent	Lorna Creswell	17.5	562	576	615	686	726	878	999	1,399
Independent	Anne Audrey Skene	14.4	463	464	491	541	572	695	860	
Conservative	Paul McBain	14.4	463	464	476	486	491	511		
Green	Fabio Villani	12.5	401	405	419	433	459			
Labour	Mark Cascarino	6.1	195	195	201	205				
Independent	Janet Kennedy	6.0	192	194	201					
Scottish Senior Citizens	Andy Anderson	4.1	132	135						
Independent	Jane Elizabeth Cotton	0.9	30							
Electorate: 11,224 Valid: 3,210 Spoilt: 23 Quota: 1,606 Turnout: 28.8%
