= Forres (ward) =

Electoral ward in Moray, Scotland

Location of the ward

Forres is one of the eight wards used to elect members of the Moray Council. It elects four Councillors.

== Councillors ==
Election	Councillors			
2007	Irene Ogilvie (SNP)	Jeff Hamilton (Independent)	Lee Bell (Independent)	Iain Young (Conservative)
2010 by	Irene Ogilvie (SNP)	Jeff Hamilton (Independent)	Lee Bell (Independent)	Lorna Creswell (Independent)
2012	Aaron McLean (SNP)	George Alexander (Independent)	Anne Skene (Independent)	Lorna Creswell (Independent)
2017	Aaron McLean (SNP)	George Alexander (Independent)	Claire Feaver (Conservative)	Lorna Creswell (Independent)
2022	Scott Lawrence (SNP)	Paul McBain (Conservative)	Kathleen Robertson (Conservative)	Draeyk Van Der Horn (Green)

== Election results ==
=== 2022 Election ===
Forres - 4 seats
Party	Candidate	FPv%	Count					
Party	Candidate	FPv%	1	2	3	4	5	6
SNP	Scott Lawrence	34.3	2,077					
Conservative	Kathleen Robertson	25.0	1,516					
Conservative	Paul McBain	15.9	962	991	1,240			
Labour	James Hynam	10.6	643	830	845	852	1,001	
Green	Draeyk Van der Horn	9.1	550	928	933	934	1,047	1,514
Independent	Shaun Moat	5.1	309	403	417	424		
Electorate: TBC Valid: 6,128 Spoilt: 71 Quota: 1,212 Turnout: 49.0%

=== 2017 Election ===
Forres - 4 seats
Party	Candidate	FPv%	Count						
Party	Candidate	FPv%	1	2	3	4	5	6	7
Conservative	Claire Feaver	35.4	2,094						
SNP	Aaron McLean (incumbent)	23.5	1,389						
Independent	George Alexander (incumbent)	16.6	981	1,247					
Green	Fabio Villani	10.4	613	671	767	773	778	835	
Independent	Lorna Creswell (incumbent)	9.4	555	739	779	815	841	1,015	1,505
Independent	Jeff Hamilton	4.1	243	335	349	360	381		
Independent	Terry Monaghan	0.6	36	54	60	62			
Electorate: 12,116 Valid: 5,911 Spoilt: 47 Quota: 1,183 Turnout: 49.2%

=== 2012 Election ===
Forres - 4 seats
Party	Candidate	FPv%	Count									
Party	Candidate	FPv%	1	2	3	4	5	6	7	8	9	10
Independent	George Alexander	25.2	1,134									
Independent	Lorna Creswell (incumbent)	12.8	575	650	676	690	815	867	871	987		
SNP	Aaron McLean	12.2	547	559	569	575	588	924				
Conservative	Paul McBain	10.4	466	484	487	507	529	540	541			
Green	Fabio Villani	10.2	457	475	488	492	524	549	552	614	631	
SNP	Irene Ogilvie (incumbent)	9.5	429	440	444	447	478					
Independent	Anne Audrey Skene	9.1	410	441	451	469	550	569	572	732	764	1,073
Independent	Jeff Hamilton (incumbent)	7.0	314	344	350	356						
UKIP	Ian Meiklejohn	2.0	91	96	99							
Scottish Senior Citizens	Andy Anderson	1.7	78	85								
Electorate: 10,999 Valid: 4,501 Spoilt: 50 Quota: 901 Turnout: 40.9%

=== 2010 by-election ===
Forres by-election (11 November 2010) - 1 seat
Party	Candidate	FPv%	Count							
Party	Candidate	FPv%	1	2	3	4	5	6	7	8
SNP	Aaron John McLean	24.1	773	774	789	800	837	899	950	1,045
Independent	Lorna Creswell	17.5	562	576	615	686	726	878	999	1,399
Independent	Anne Audrey Skene	14.4	463	464	491	541	572	695	860	
Conservative	Paul McBain	14.4	463	464	476	486	491	511		
Green	Fabio Villani	12.5	401	405	419	433	459			
Labour	Mark Cascarino	6.1	195	195	201	205				
Independent	Janet Kennedy	6.0	192	194	201					
Scottish Senior Citizens	Andy Anderson	4.1	132	135						
Independent	Jane Elizabeth Cotton	0.9	30							
Electorate: 11,224 Valid: 3,210 Spoilt: 23 Quota: 1,606 Turnout: 28.8%

=== 2007 Election ===
Forres- 4 Seats
Party	Candidate	FPv%	Count						
Party	Candidate	FPv%	1	2	3	4	5	6	7
SNP	Irene Ogilvie	29.8	1,602						
Conservative	Iain Young	28.8	1,546						
Independent	Jeff Hamilton	13.3	716	789	880	992	1,122		
Independent	Lee Bell	9.0	482	540	610	672	831	849	1,160
Scottish Senior Citizens	Thomas Anderson	8.2	438	549	615	653	719	726	
Independent	Pat Carroll	6.1	326	368	413	492			
Independent	Rick Walker	4.9	261	294	356				
Valid: 5,371 Spoilt: 129 Quota: 1,075 Turnout: 51.1%
