= Elgin City North (ward) =

Electoral ward in Moray, Scotland

Location of the ward

Elgin City North is one of the eight wards used to elect members of the Moray Council. It elects three Councillors.

== Councillors ==
Election	Councillors		
2007	Mike Shand (SNP)	John Russell (Ind.)	Barry Jarvis (Labour)
2012	Mike Shand (SNP)	Patsy Gowans (SNP)	Barry Jarvis (Labour)
2014 by	Mike Shand (SNP)	Patsy Gowans (SNP)	Kirsty Reid (SNP)
2017	Paula Coy (SNP)	Sandy Cooper (Ind.)	Frank Brown (Conservative)
2019 by	Paula Coy (SNP)	Maria McLean (Conservative)	Frank Brown (Conservative)
2022	Jérémie Fernandes (SNP)	Sandy Keith (Labour)	Amber Dunbar (Conservative)

== Election results ==
=== 2022 Election ===
Elgin City North - 3 seats
Party	Candidate	FPv%	Count
Party	Candidate	FPv%	1
SNP	Jérémie Fernandes	32.6	1,199
Labour	Sandy Keith	28.5	1,048
Conservative	Amber Dunbar	25.9	952
Independent	Graham Jarvis	4.6	170
Green	Rebecca Kail	4.5	165
Liberal Democrats	Neil Alexander	3.9	144
Electorate: TBC Valid: 3,678 Spoilt: 32 Quota: 920 Turnout: 40.2%

=== 2017 by-election ===
Elgin City North by-election (13 July 2017)
Party	Candidate	FPv%	Count		
Party	Candidate	FPv%	1	2	3
Conservative	Maria McLean	40.0	923	970	1,061
SNP	Patsy Gowans	38.8	895	904	994
Labour	Nick Taylor	15.8	365	389	
Independent	Terry Monaghan	5.4	124		
Electorate: 9,354 Valid: 2,307 Spoilt: 17 Quota: 1153.5 Turnout: 24.8%

=== 2017 Election ===
Elgin City North - 3 seats
Party	Candidate	FPv%	Count					
Party	Candidate	FPv%	1	2	3	4	5	6
Conservative	Frank Brown	32.9	1,181					
Independent	Sandy Cooper	14.9	532	606	767	933		
SNP	Paula Coy	17.7	634	639	672	714	720	1,279
SNP	Patsy Gowans (incumbent)	15.0	537	540	557	630	634	
Labour	Nick Taylor	11.9	429	477	536			
Independent	Billy Adams	7.4	266	339				
Electorate: 9,237 Valid: 3,579 Spoilt: 65 Quota: 895 Turnout: 39.5%

=== 2014 by-election ===
Elgin City North By-election (11 December 2014) - 1 Seat
Party	Candidate	FPv%	Count				
Party	Candidate	FPv%	1	2	3	4	5
SNP	Kirsty Ella Reid	38.0	728	748	764	773	850
Independent	Sandy Cooper	24.6	472	483	499	595	693
Labour	Craig Graham	15.0	287	305	316	368	
Conservative	Alex Griffiths	14.2	273	280	299		
UKIP	Ramsay Urquhart	4.2	81	84			
Green	Morvern Forrest	4.0	77				
Electorate: 9,263 Valid: 1,918 Spoilt: 20 Quota: 960 Turnout: 20.9%

=== 2012 Election ===
Elgin City North - 3 seats
Party	Candidate	FPv%	Count				
Party	Candidate	FPv%	1	2	3	4	5
Labour	Barry Jarvis (incumbent)	29.9	766				
SNP	Mike Shand (incumbent)	23.2	596	613	662		
SNP	Patsy Gowans	20.1	515	527	550	567	688
Conservative	Frank Brown	17.5	448	467	566	566	
Independent	Darren Margach	9.4	241	274			
Electorate: 8,386 Valid: 2,566 Spoilt: 31 Quota: 642 Turnout: 30.6%

=== 2007 Election ===
Elgin City North- 3 Seats
Party	Candidate	FPv%	Count			
Party	Candidate	FPv%	1	2	3	4
SNP	Mike Shand	41.3	1,500			
Labour	Barry Jarvis	23.9	866	1,005		
Independent	John Russell	18.5	671	837	876	1,349
Conservative	Frank Brown	16.3	592	648	666	
Valid: 3,629 Spoilt: 46 Quota: 908 Turnout: 45.8%
