= Tim Eagle =

Scottish politician

Tim Eagle MSP
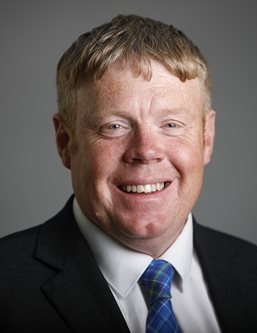
- Official portrait, 2026

Member of the Scottish Parliament for Highlands and Islands (1 of 7 Regional MSPs)
- Incumbent
- Assumed office 13 February 2024
- Preceded by: Donald Cameron

Scottish Conservative portfolios
- 2024-: Shadow Cabinet Secretary for Rural Affairs, Land Reform and Fishing

Personal details
- Born: Timothy Eagle
- Party: Scottish Conservatives
- Education: University of Aberdeen
- Occupation: Farmer, Land Agent

Tim Eagle is a Member of the Scottish Parliament (MSP) for the Highlands and Islands region since 2024. He is a member of the Scottish Conservatives.

== Career ==
Eagle runs a small arable and sheep farm, and prior to his election, was a land agent. He was also a police officer and worked as a missionary in Mozambique.

Eagle was the Conservative candidate for Moray at the 2021 Scottish Parliament election, finishing second to the SNP's Richard Lochhead with 16,823 votes (40.9%). He was fifth on the party list for the Highlands and Islands region.

Eagle was a candidate in 2022 Buckie by-election for Moray Council. He served in the ward from 2017 to 2022 and was the Conservative group leader on the council.

=== Member of the Scottish Parliament ===
When Donald Cameron was appointed to the House of Lords in the 2024 Special Honours, Eagle moved up the list into the Scottish Parliament. He was sworn in on 20 February.

In October 2024, Eagle was appointed Shadow Cabinet Secretary for Rural Affairs, Land Reform and Fishing in the Shadow Cabinet of Russell Findlay.

He was the Conservative candidate for Moray in the 2026 Scottish Parliament election. In the 2026 Scottish Parliament election, he was re-elected as a regional MSP in the Highlands and Islands.

== See also ==
- 6th Scottish Parliament
