= Moray Council =

Local authority in Moray, Scotland

Moray Council Comhairle Mhoireibh
- Coat of arms

- Council logo

Type
- Type: Unitary authority

History
- Preceded by: Moray District Council (1975-1996)

Leadership
- Civic Leader: John Cowe, Independent since 10 August 2022
- Leader: Kathleen Robertson, Conservative since 18 May 2022
- Chief Executive: Karen Greaves since 2025

Structure
- Seats: 26 councillors
- Graph of the party split among 26 seats.
- Political groups: Administration (10) Conservative (10) Other parties (16) SNP (7) Labour (3) Green (2) Independent (4)

Elections
- Voting system: Single transferable vote
- Last election: 5 May 2022
- Next election: 6 May 2027

Meeting place
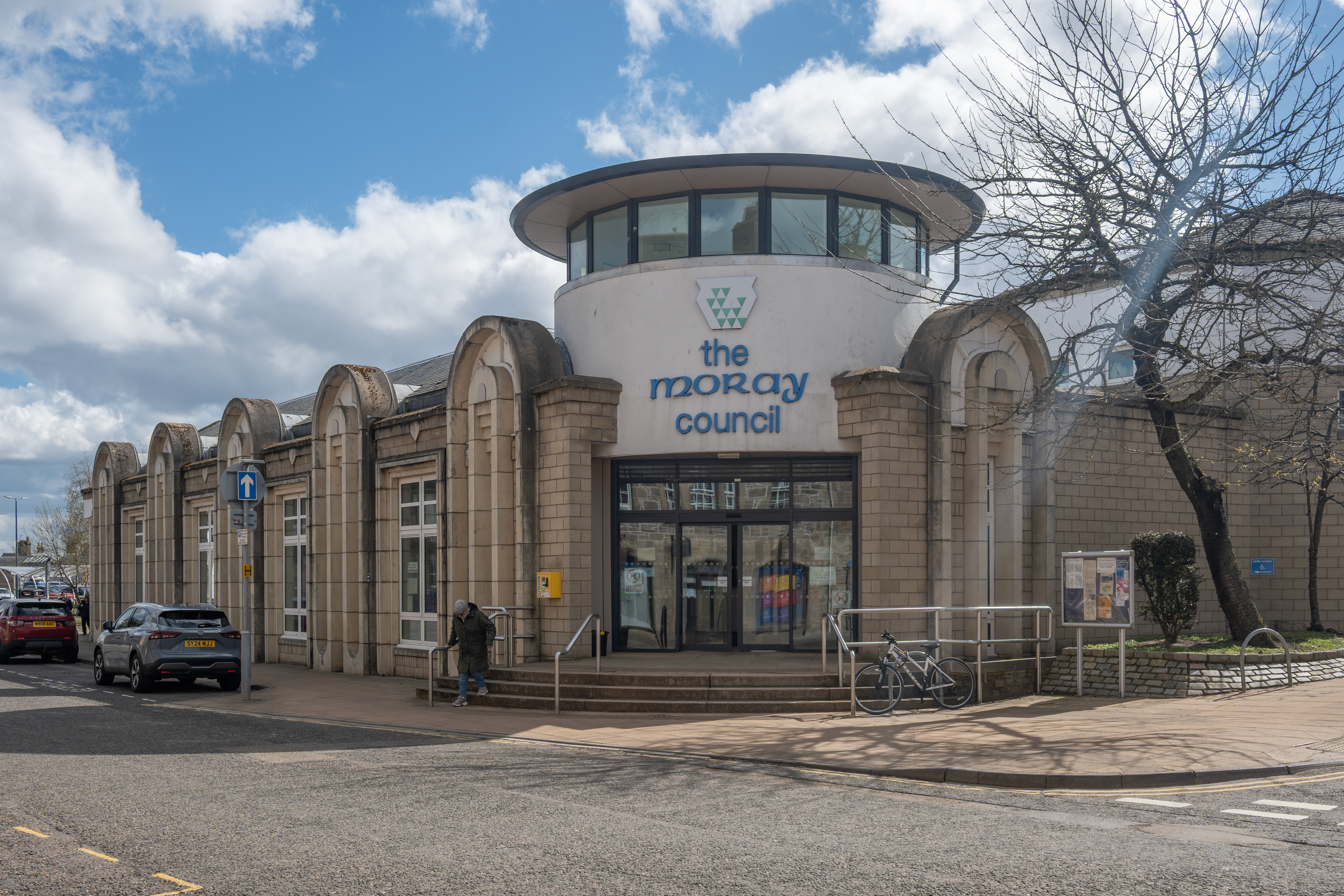
- Council Offices, High Street, Elgin, IV30 1BX

Website
- www.moray.gov.uk

Moray Council (Scottish Gaelic: Comhairle Mhoireibh) is the local government authority for Moray, one of the 32 council areas of Scotland. The council is based in Elgin.

== History ==
The County of Moray was one of Scotland's historic counties and had a county council from 1890 until 1975. The county was called Elginshire until 1919 when the name was changed to Moray.

Local government across Scotland was reorganised in 1975 under the Local Government (Scotland) Act 1973, which replaced the counties and burghs with a two-tier structure of upper-tier regions and lower-tier districts. Moray became a district within the Grampian region, with some significant differences between the boundaries of the pre-1975 county and the post-1975 district. Moray District Council served as a lower-tier authority subordinate to Grampian Regional Council.

The regions and districts were abolished in 1996, when the Moray district became a council area, governed by Moray Council, which took on all the local government functions previously performed by the district and regional councils.

== Political control ==
The council has been under no overall control since 2007. Following the 2022 election, a Conservative minority administration formed to run the council.

The first election to Moray District Council was held in 1974. It initially operated as a shadow authority alongside the outgoing authorities until the new system came into force on 16 May 1975. A shadow authority was again elected in 1995 ahead of the reforms which came into force on 1 April 1996. Political control of the council since 1975 has been as follows:

Moray District Council

Party in control	Years
No overall control	1975–1996

Moray Council

Party in control	Years
SNP	1996–1999
No overall control	1999–present

=== Leadership ===
The council appoints a 'civic leader' to act as its ceremonial figurehead. Since 2012, political leadership has been provided by the leader of the council. The leaders since 2012 have been:

Councillor	Party	From	To	Notes
Allan Wright	Conservative	9 May 2012	1 Jan 2015	
Stewart Cree	Independent	1 Jan 2015	May 2017	
George Alexander	Independent	24 May 2017	13 Jun 2018	
Graham Leadbitter	SNP	13 Jun 2018	May 2022	
Neil McLennan	Conservative	18 May 2022	Jun 2022	Joint leaders
Kathleen Robertson	Conservative	18 May 2022	Jun 2022	Joint leaders
Kathleen Robertson	Conservative	Jun 2022		

=== Composition ===
Following the 2022 election and subsequent changes up to December 2025, the composition of the council was:

Party	Seats
Conservative	10
SNP	7
Labour	3
Green	2
Independent	4
Total	26

One of the independent councillors describes themselves as a "non-aligned Conservative". The next election is due in 2027.

== Elections ==
The council consists of 26 councillors elected for a five-year term from 8 wards. Since 2007 elections have been held every five years under the single transferable vote system, introduced by the Local Governance (Scotland) Act 2004, replacing the first-past-the-post voting system.

The most recent full council election took place on 5 May 2022, in which no party won a majority of seats, as has been the case since the 2007 election. The Conservatives won 11 seats therefore overtaking the Scottish National Party, on 8 seats, as the largest party. Labour won 3 seats, whilst both the Liberal Democrats and the Greens won 1 seat each. Independents won 2 seats, a decline of 6, their worst result since the 1995 election.

The next full council election is due to take place on 6 May 2027. Election results since 1995 have been as follows:

Year	Seats	Conservative	SNP	Labour	Liberal Democrats	Green	Independent / Other	Notes
1995	18	0	13	3	1	0	2	SNP majority
1999	26	1	2	6	2	0	15	No overall control
2003	26	1	3	5	1	0	16	Independent majority
2007	26	3	9	2	0	0	12	No overall control
2012	26	3	10	3	0	0	10	No overall control
2017	26	8	9	1	0	0	8	No overall control
2022	26	11	8	3	1	1	2	No overall control

== Premises ==
The council meets at the Council Offices on High Street in Elgin. The older part of the building facing High Street was completed in 1952 adjoining Elgin Sheriff Court for the former joint Moray and Nairn County Council. Large extensions were later added to the south of the building, facing Greyfriars Street. In 2012 the council opened an additional annexe nearby at 2–10 High Street in a converted supermarket.

== Wards ==
Map of the area's wards (2017)

The current multi-member ward system (8 wards, 26 seats) was introduced for the 2007 election:

Ward number	Name	Location	Seats
1	Speyside Glenlivet		3
2	Keith and Cullen		3
3	Buckie		3
4	Fochabers Lhanbryde		3
5	Heldon and Laich		4
6	Elgin City North		3
7	Elgin City South		3
8	Forres		4
