= Cummingston railway station =

Former railway station in Scotland

Cummingston

General information
- Location: Hopeman, Moray; Scotland
- Coordinates: 57.7053°N 3.4510°W
- Grid reference: NJ136693
- Platforms: 1

Other information
- Status: Disused

History
- Original company: Highland Railway
- Pre-grouping: Highland Railway

Key dates
- 10 October 1892: Station opened
- 1 April 1904: Passenger services withdrawn
Location

Cummingston railway station stood on the Burghead and Hopeman Branch of the Highland Railway and once served the small village of Cummingston, formerly Cummingstown, in the Scottish district of Moray (formerly Elginshire).

== History ==
The Inverness and Aberdeen Junction Railway opened the original branch from Alves Junction to Burghead in 1862. In 1865 the line was taken over by the Highland Railway and work started on continuing the branch from Burghead to Hopeman via Cummingston, the extension opening on 10 October 1892.

Cummingston had closed as early as 1904 however the London, Midland and Scottish Railway took over the line itself in 1923, the last passenger train on the branch running on 12 September 1931. Services ran to Keith or to Inverness by changing at Alves.

== Infrastructure ==
The short platform on the single track line had no passing loop but had a siding, signal box and signals, with a small shelter. It was reached by a path that ran from near the overbridge. Standing on the landward side of the line the station was opened to serve the village for residents and visitors. Nothing now remains of the station and the track has been lifted, however the route is in use as a cyclepath and original road overbridge still survives to the south of the station site.

Preceding station	Historical railways	Following station
Burghead; Line closed, station closed	Highland Railway; Highland Railway	Hopeman; Line closed, station closed
