= Burghead Fort =

Early medieval fortress in Scotland

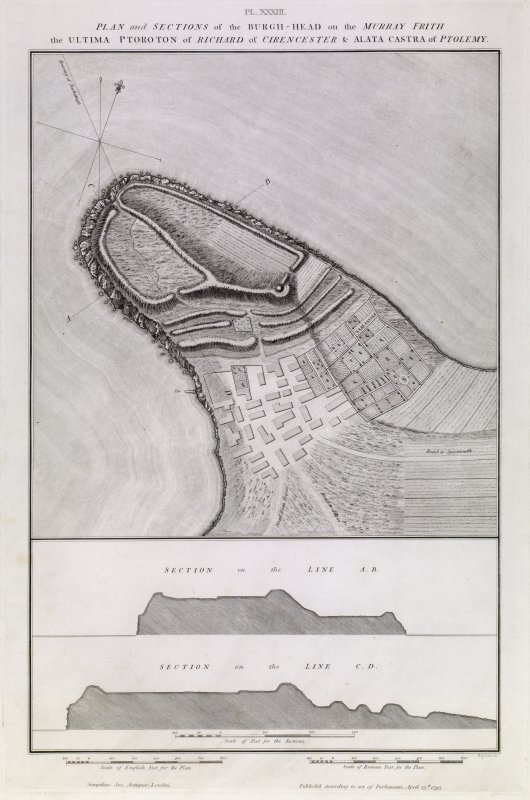
- Plan of the remains of the fort drawn by General William Roy and published in 1793

- Location within Scotland
- 57.7036°N 3.4971°W
- Type: Promontory fort
- Periods: Iron Age, Pictish

Site notes
- Length: 1,000 feet (300 m)
- Width: 600 feet (180 m)
- Area: 12.4 acres (5.0 ha)

Burghead Fort was a Pictish promontory fort on the site now occupied by the small town of Burghead in Moray, Scotland. It was one of the earliest power centres of the Picts and was three times the size of any other enclosed site in Early Medieval Scotland. The fort was probably the main centre of the Pictish Kingdom of Fortriu, flourishing with the kingdom itself from the 4th to the 9th centuries.

Burghead is not recorded in any surviving annals and its name in the Pictish language is not recorded, but it may be the Pinnata Castra that features in Ptolemy's 2nd-century Geography. The original defences may date from the Iron Age but were substantially rebuilt during the early historic period.

The remains of the fort were largely destroyed when the harbour and town of Burghead were remodelled in the early 19th century, but its layout is recorded in a plan drawn by William Roy and published posthumously in 1793. Sections of its inner ramparts still stand up to 9.8 feet (3.0 m) high, and a small section of the innermost outer rampart survives as the "Doorie Hill". The fort's underground ritual well can be visited and the site has a visitor centre where important Pictish sculptures from the fort are displayed.

== Layout and construction ==
The site consisted of a walled inner enclosure measuring 1,000 feet (300 m) in length and 600 feet (180 m) in width, which was divided into two wards or courts: a smaller, higher enclosure or citadel to the southwest, and a larger, lower one to the northeast. In total the enclosure occupied an area of 12.4 acres (5.0 ha). Cutting off the enclosure and the headland was a system of three ramparts and ditches, together measuring 800 feet (240 m) by 180 feet (55 m), with each cut by entrances midway along. These were constructed of earth and rubble. Excavations in the 1890s revealed a paved roadway through the fort.

The western wall of the upper enclosure was excavated in 1969 and found to be exceptionally massive, with an 8-metre-thick (26 ft) base and a surviving height of 3 metres (9.8 ft). The wall would originally have been even more formidable, up to 6 metres (20 ft) high and possibly topped by a wooden superstructure. It was constructed with stone revetments at the front and back around an internal framework of transverse and longitudinal timbers, with the centre of the structure filled with stone rubble and rolled pebbles. The ramparts were constructed on foundations made of layers of oak laid upon sand, and the oak beams of the timber framework almost certainly protruded from the sandstone walls. The stone ramparts of the lower enclosure were also built around a timber framework, but these were held together by giant iron spikes – an exceptional construction technique unrelated to earlier British Iron Age building traditions, instead of being associated with the Murus Gallicus structures of the late La Tène fortifications of continental Europe.

== History and use ==
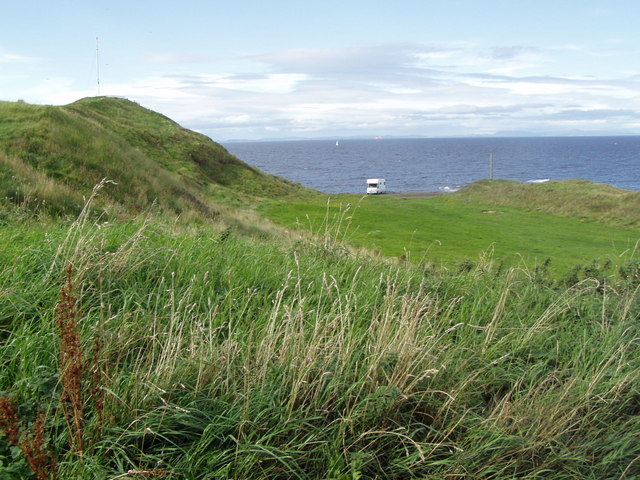
Remaining ramparts of the lower enclosure

The fort was built in multiple phases. Radiocarbon dating has demonstrated that the main walls were constructed in the early historic period, possibly as early as the late 3rd century, and they were refurbished in the 6th or 7th centuries. The layout of the fort was typical of those built across Britain and France in the late Iron Age, though, suggesting that the Picts may have reoccupied an earlier stronghold and reinforced it by adding the stone fortifications. Differences in the techniques used to build the walls of the upper and lower enclosures suggest different dates of construction, and the triple ramparts and ditches that cut the enclosure off from the mainland may predate the main body of the fort and represent earlier Iron Age defences. Signs of earlier occupation found on the site of the fort include a Late Bronze Age spearhead, a Greek coin from the reign of Nero (54–68 AD), and a Celtic stone head found within the well. Indications of non-domestic occupation have been found from the Iron Age, Norse and Early Medieval periods, but no sign of occupancy of the fort survives after the 9th century, a period approximately coinciding with entries in the Annals of Ulster recording devastating Norse raids on the Kingdom of Fortriu.

The two enclosures of the main fort had separate entrances, with no evidence of any internal gateway between them, implying a hierarchical relationship between them. The higher section of the main fort to the west may have formed a high-status enclosure including a royal hall and dwelling, with the larger enclosure to the northeast containing a settlement. The higher enclosure would also have included buildings housing the ruler's retinue and others supplying the royal court with its needs. The foundation stones of buildings have been found within the lower enclosure and there is archaeological evidence of livestock being kept within the outer walls of the fort. The site's importance and its excellent nearby anchorage makes it likely that it was an important base for Pictish naval forces, which are recorded as significant between the 4th and the 8th centuries.

The fort had religious as well as secular importance. The bull carvings found at the site in the 19th century have been seen as evidence for a surviving pagan bull cult, and the underground well in its rock-cut chamber as the centre of a pagan water cult, a possibility reinforced by the Celtic stone head that was discovered in the well in the 19th century. The Burning of the Clavie, which still takes place in Burghead annually, has also been seen as a surviving pagan fire festival. There is archaeological evidence of a chapel within the fort by the 8th century, and decorated stones dating from around AD 800 found in Burghead churchyard were probably the remains of Christian crosses. Fragments of an early Christian shrine have been discovered immediately outside the fort, and the secular power centre of the fort may have had a significant relationship with the major Pictish religious centres of Kinneddar, located 8 miles (13 km) to the east, and Portmahomack, which is just visible from Burghead on the opposite side of the Moray Firth.

== The Burghead Bulls ==
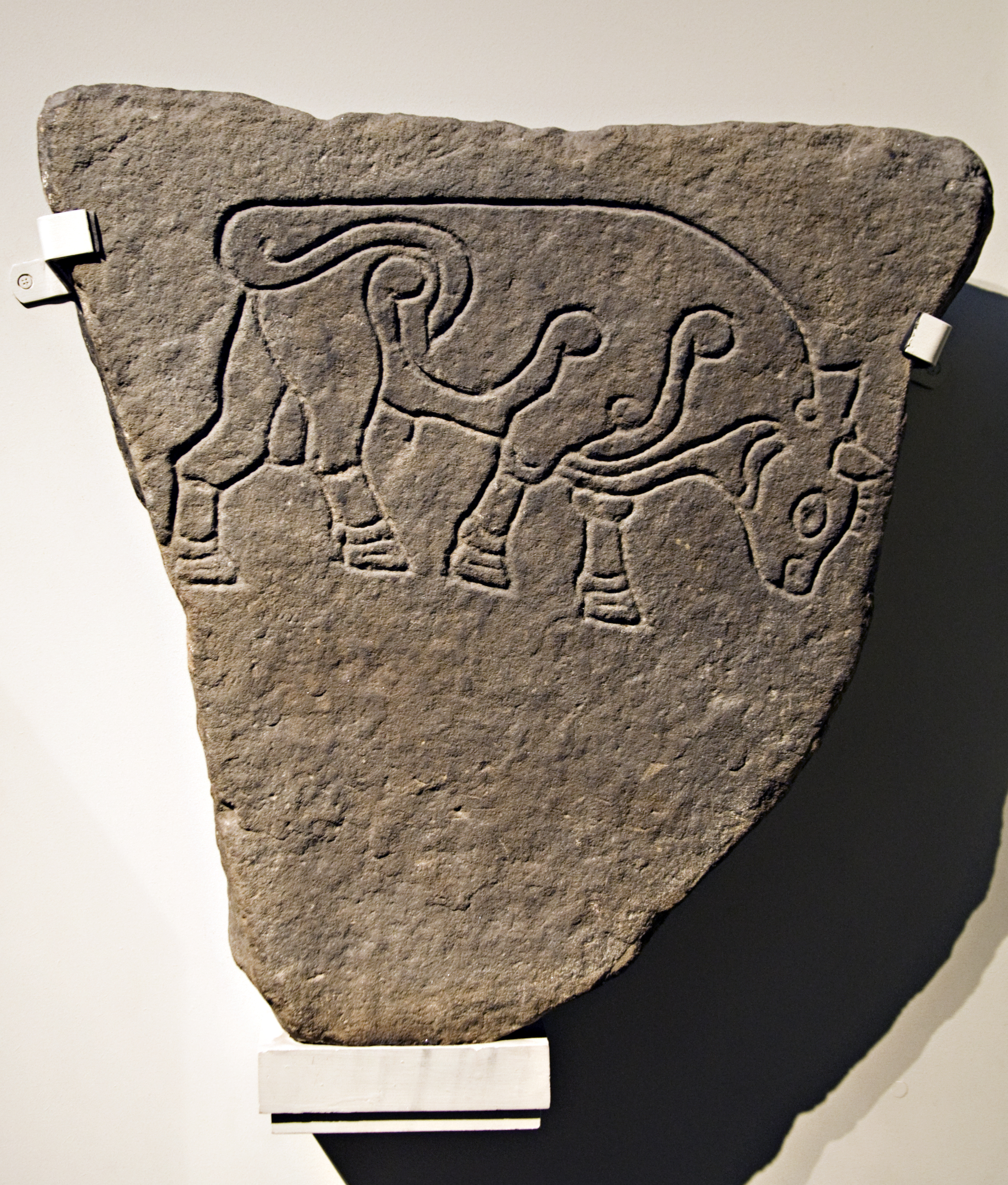
One of the Burghead Bulls on display at the British Museum

During the destruction of the site in the early 19th century, up to thirty stone panels carrying carved images of bulls were discovered. Although most of these were built into the quay wall of Burghead Harbour and thus lost, six remain: two in the visitor centre in Burghead itself, two in Elgin Museum, one in the National Museum of Scotland in Edinburgh and one in the British Museum in London. The Bulls have been dated to the 5th century or later and may have formed a frieze set into the ramparts of the fort, possibly forming part of a warrior cult celebrating strength and aggression.

The degree of naturalism of the Burghead Bulls is unequalled in early medieval art, and the carvings testify to the site's exceptional importance and suggest it may have been an important royal centre in the early historic period.

== Bibliography ==
- Driscoll, Stephen T. (2007). "Burghead". In Lynch, Michael (ed.). The Oxford Companion to Scottish History. Oxford: Oxford University Press. p. 58. ISBN 9780199234820.
- Foster, Sally (2014). Picts, Gaels and Scots: Early Historic Scotland. Edinburgh: Birlinn. ISBN 9781780271910.
- Fraser, James E. (2009). From Caledonia to Pictland: Scotland to 795. Edinburgh: Edinburgh University Press. ISBN 9780748612321.
- Konstam, Angus (2010). Strongholds of the Picts: The Fortifications of Dark Age Scotland. Oxford: Osprey Publishing. ISBN 9781846036866.
- Shepherd, Ian A. G. (1993). "The Picts in Moray". In Sellar, W. D. H. (ed.). Moray: Province and People. Edinburgh: Scottish Society for Northern Studies. pp. 75–90. ISBN 9780950599472.
