= Burghead Bulls =

Group of carved Pictish stones

The Burghead Bulls are a group of carved Pictish stones from the site of Burghead Fort in Moray, Scotland, each featuring an incised image of a bull. Up to 30 were discovered during the demolition of the fort to create the town of Burghead in the 19th century, but most were lost when they were used to build the harbour quayside. Six remain: two in the Visitor Centre in Burghead, two in Elgin Museum, one in the National Museum of Scotland in Edinburgh, and one in the British Museum in London.

Interpretation of the stones' original role has varied. Some scholars have suggested they were displayed on the fort's ramparts as symbols of power; others have seen them as having a votive role in a frieze as part of a pagan fertility cult; while others argue they were standing stones lining a processional route through the ramparts, a role suggested by their likely original kite-shaped form. The Bulls probably represent an early pre-Christian phase of the fort's existence in the 7th or late 6th centuries, while the later shrine panels and cross-slabs represented by the Burghead sculpture fragments indicate the presence of an Early Christian centre during a later period, as the association between the church and royal power grew from the 7th century onwards.

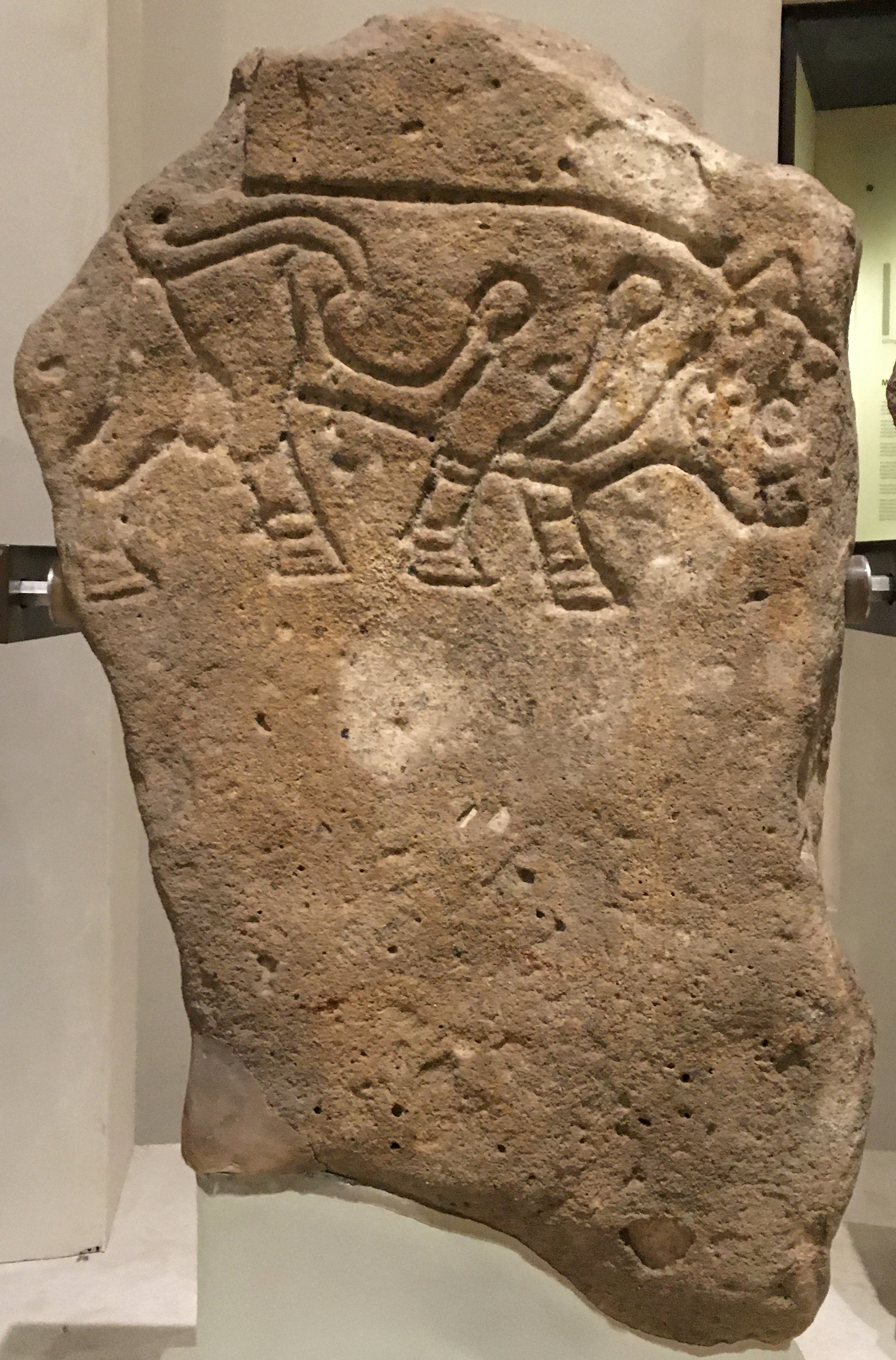
Burghead 1 on display at the National Museum of Scotland, Edinburgh

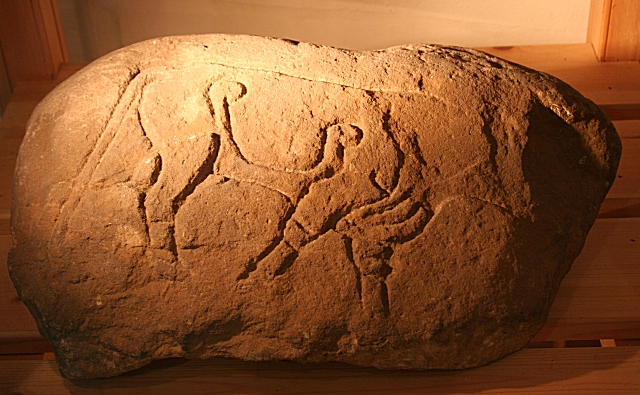
Burghead 2 on display at Burghead Visitor Centre

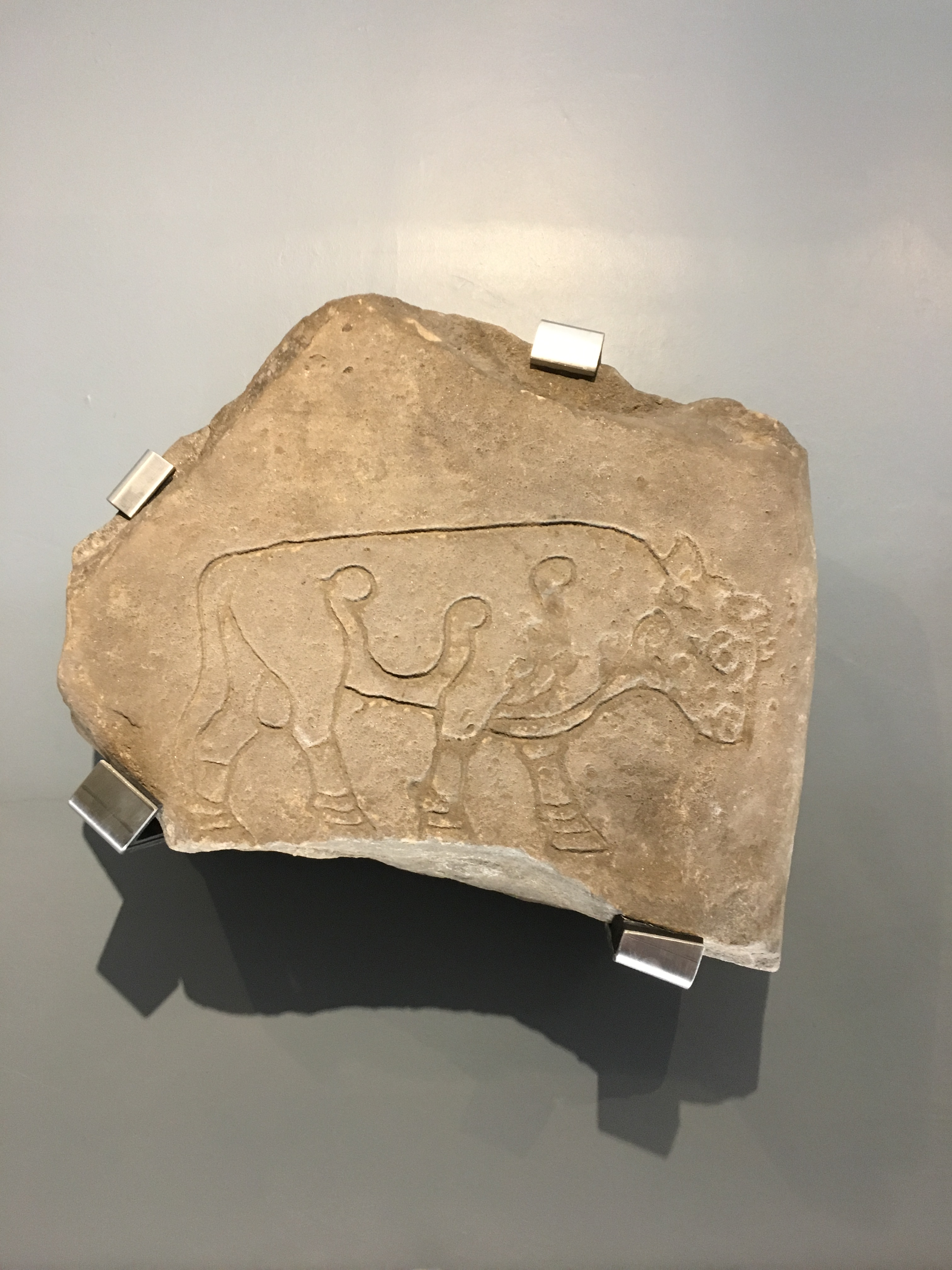
Burghead 3 on display at Elgin Museum

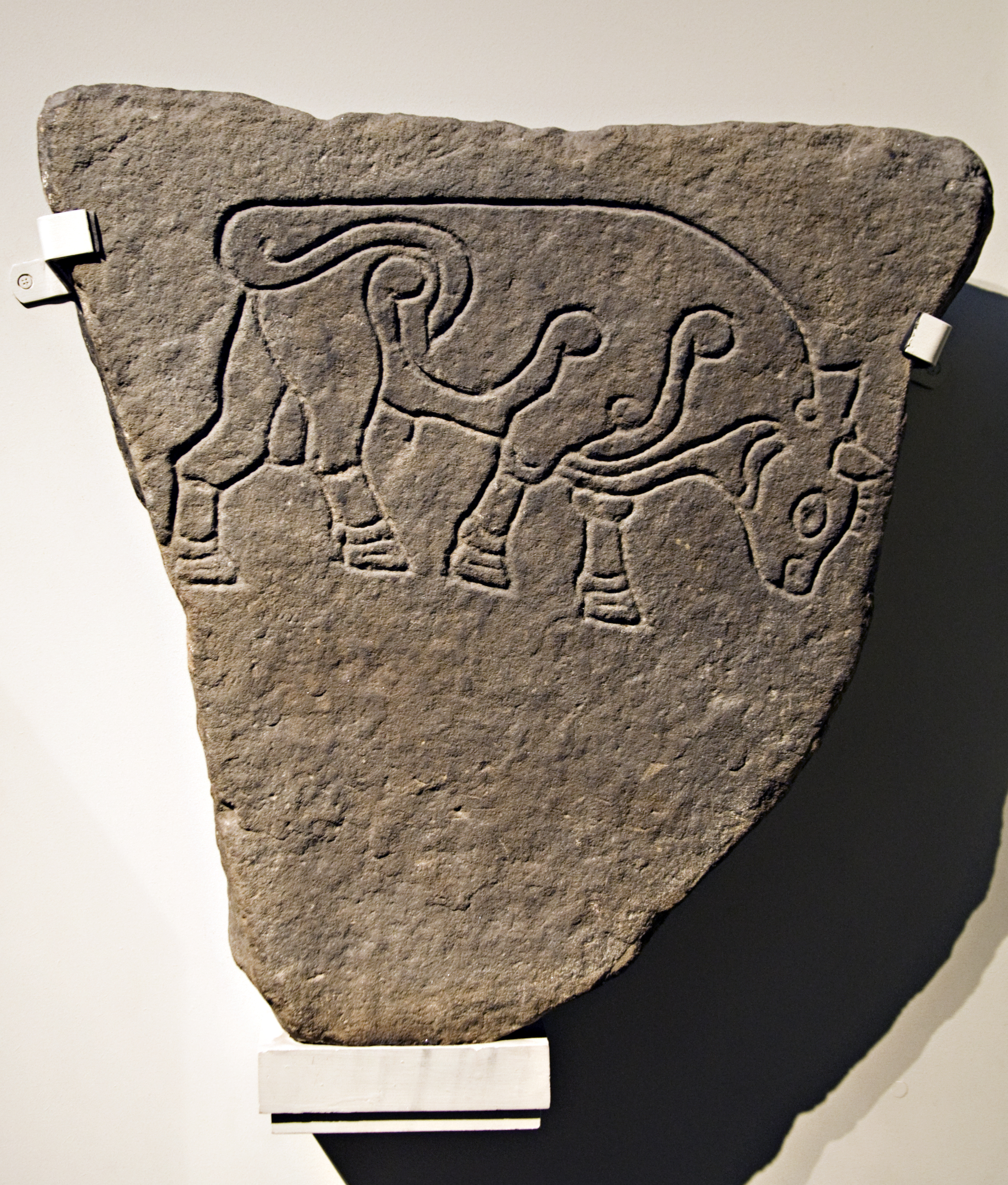
Burghead 5 on display at the British Museum, London

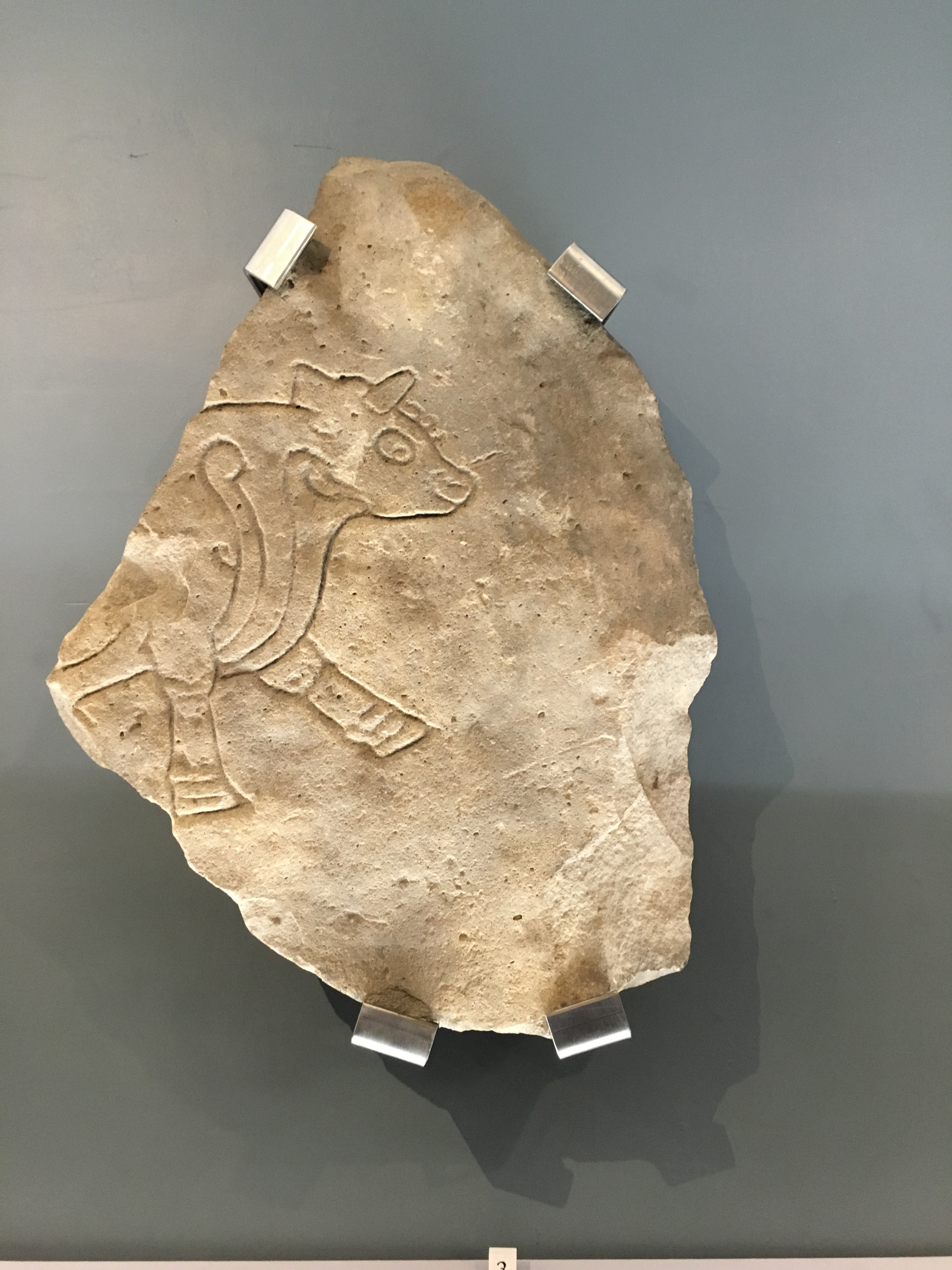
Burghead 6 on display at Elgin Museum

	Type	Date	Material and Dimensions	Location found	Date found	Current location	Notes
Burghead 1	Symbol stone	7th century	Sandstone, H 0.69m x W 0.43m x D 0.08m	Burghead Fort or Burghead Well	1809	National Museum of Scotland, Edinburgh	Some sources claim that this was discovered in Burghead Well, but the earliest source is clear that it was in fact discovered during quarrying of the fort ramparts in 1809.
Burghead 2	Symbol stone fragment	7th century	Sandstone, H 0.31m x W 0.48m x D 0.10m	South Quay, Burghead Harbour	1862	Burghead Visitor Centre	
Burghead 3	Symbol stone fragment	7th century	Sandstone, H 0.41m x W 0.53m x D 0.18m	Burghead	Before 1867	Elgin Museum	
Burghead 4	Symbol stone fragment	7th century	Sandstone, H 0.28m x W 0.28m x D 0.10m	South Quay, Burghead Harbour	1867	Burghead Visitor Centre	Discovered during the demolition of a house in South Quay.
Burghead 5	Symbol stone	7th century	Sandstone, 0.53m x W 0.53m x D 0.08m	Burghead	Before 1809	British Museum, London	Exhibited at the Society of Antiquaries in London in 1809.
Burghead 6	Symbol stone fragment	7th century	Sandstone, H 0.61m x W 0.46m x D 0.15m	South Quay, Burghead Harbour	1884	Elgin Museum	

== Bibliography ==
- Noble, Gordon (2019). "Fortified settlement in northern Pictland". In Noble, Gordon; Evans, Nicholas (eds.). The King in the North: The Pictish Realms of Fortriu and Ce. Birlinn. pp. 39–57. ISBN 178027551X.
