= Hopeman railway station =

Disused railway station in Hopeman, Moray

Hopeman
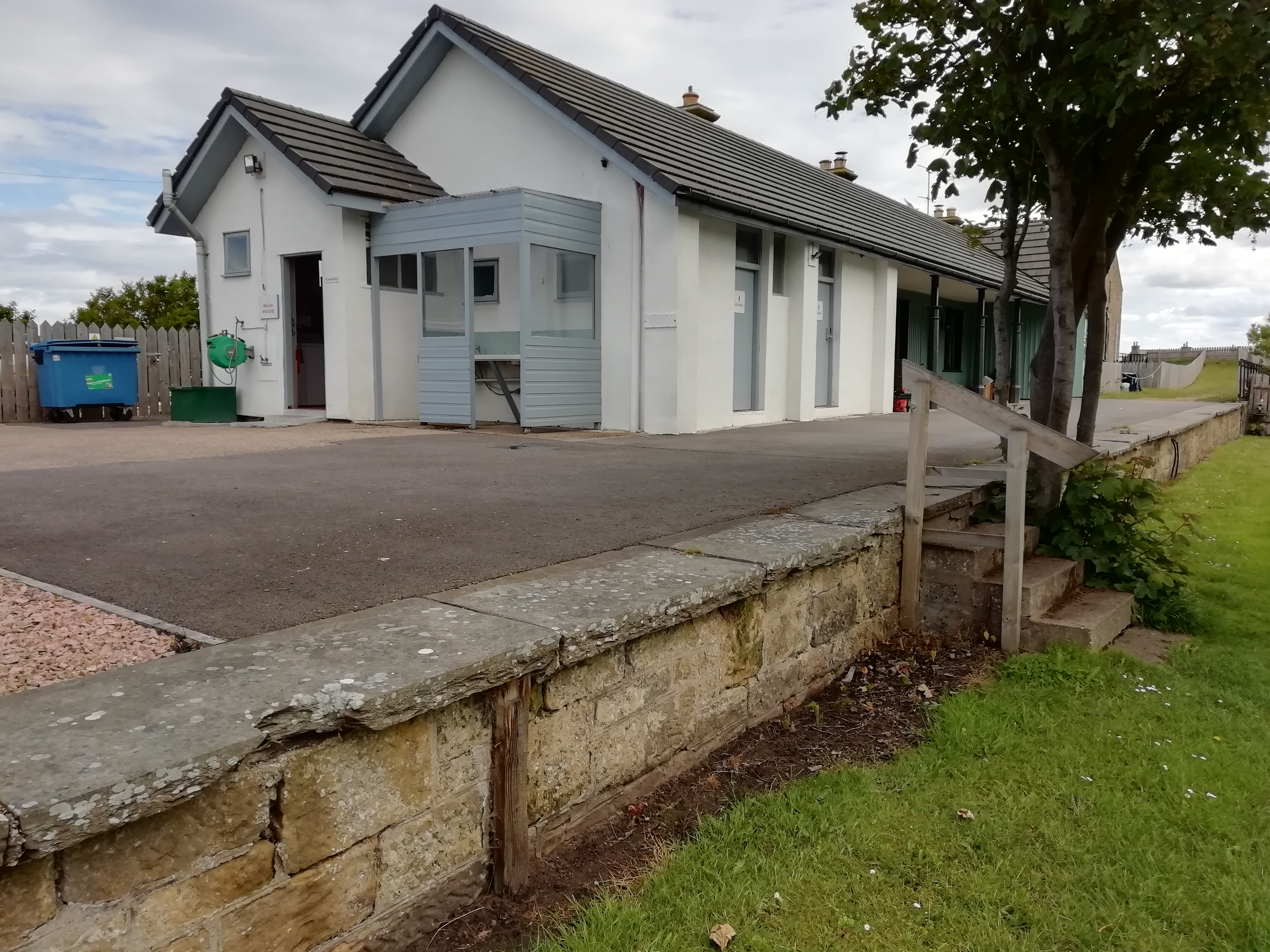
- The former station platform in 2019

General information
- Location: Hopeman, Moray; Scotland
- Coordinates: 57.7087°N 3.4369°W
- Grid reference: NJ144696
- Platforms: 1

Other information
- Status: Disused

History
- Original company: Highland Railway
- Post-grouping: London, Midland and Scottish Railway

Key dates
- 10 October 1892: Opened
- 1 January 1917: Closed
- 2 June 1919: Opened
- 14 September 1931: Closed to passengers
- 30 December 1957: Closed completely
Location

Hopeman railway station served the village of Hopeman, Moray, Scotland from 1892 to 1957 on the Highland Railway's branch line from Alves.

== History ==
The station was opened on 10 October 1892 by the Highland Railway. The station closed to passengers on 14 September 1931 and completely on 30 December 1957. Between 1 January 1917 and 2 June 1919 passenger services, except school services, had been withdrawn as a wartime measure.

Despite being closed to passengers the station was host to a LMS camping coach in 1935 and 1936 followed by three camping coaches from 1937 to 1939.

Preceding station	Disused railways	Following station
Terminus	Highland Railway; Alves branch	Cummingston; Line and station closed
