= Burghead =

Town in Moray, Scotland

Coordinates: 57.700°N 3.485°W

Burghead: Scottish Gaelic: Am Broch; Scots: Burgheid / The Broch
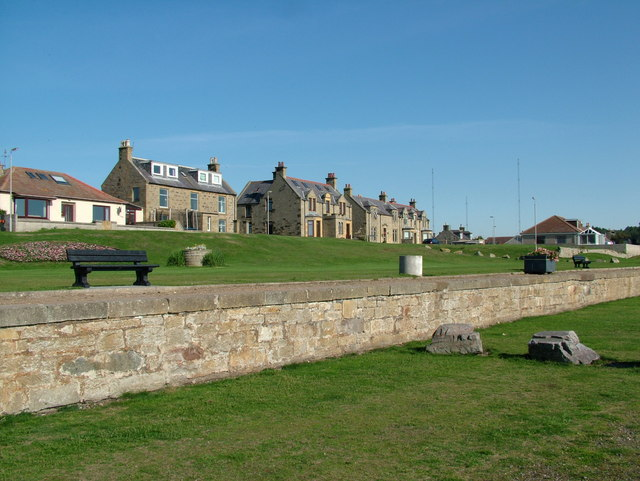
- Burghead seafront

- Location within Moray
- Population: 1,840 (2020)
- Language: English; Scots (Doric)
- OS grid reference: NJ116688
  - Edinburgh: 168 miles (262 km)
  - London: 555 miles (894 km)
- Civil parish: Duffus
- Council area: Moray
- Lieutenancy area: Moray
- Country: Scotland
- Sovereign state: United Kingdom
- Post town: ELGIN
- Postcode district: IV30
- Dialling code: 01343
- Police: Scotland
- Fire: Scottish
- Ambulance: Scottish
- UK Parliament: Moray West, Nairn and Strathspey
- Scottish Parliament: Moray
- Website: burghead.com

Burghead (Scots: Burgheid or The Broch, Scottish Gaelic: Am Broch) is a small town in Moray, Scotland, about 8 miles (13 km) north-west of Elgin. The town is mainly built on a peninsula that projects north-westward into the Moray Firth, surrounding it by water on three sides. People from Burghead are called Brochers.

The present town was built between 1805 and 1809, destroying in the process more than half of the site of an important Pictish fort. General Roy's map shows the defences as they existed in the 18th century although he wrongly attributed them to the Romans. The fort was probably a major Pictish centre and was where carved slabs depicting bulls, known as the Burghead Bulls, were found. A chambered well of some considerable antiquity was discovered in 1809 and walls and a roof were later added to help preserve it. Each year on 11 January a fire festival known as the Burning of the Clavie takes place; it is thought that the festival dates back to the 17th century, although it could easily predate this by several centuries. Burghead is often known by locals as The Broch, a nickname also applied to Fraserburgh in nearby Aberdeenshire.

A recent dig just beyond the boundary of Burghead at Clarkly Hill has uncovered Iron Age circular stone houses and Pictish building foundations, as well as silver and bronze Roman coins and a gold finger ring possibly from the Baltic region. Significant evidence of large scale Iron smelting has also been found, providing evidence that iron was probably being traded from this site. The National Museum of Scotland has carried out significant exploration which leads it to believe this is a significant site of interest.

== History ==
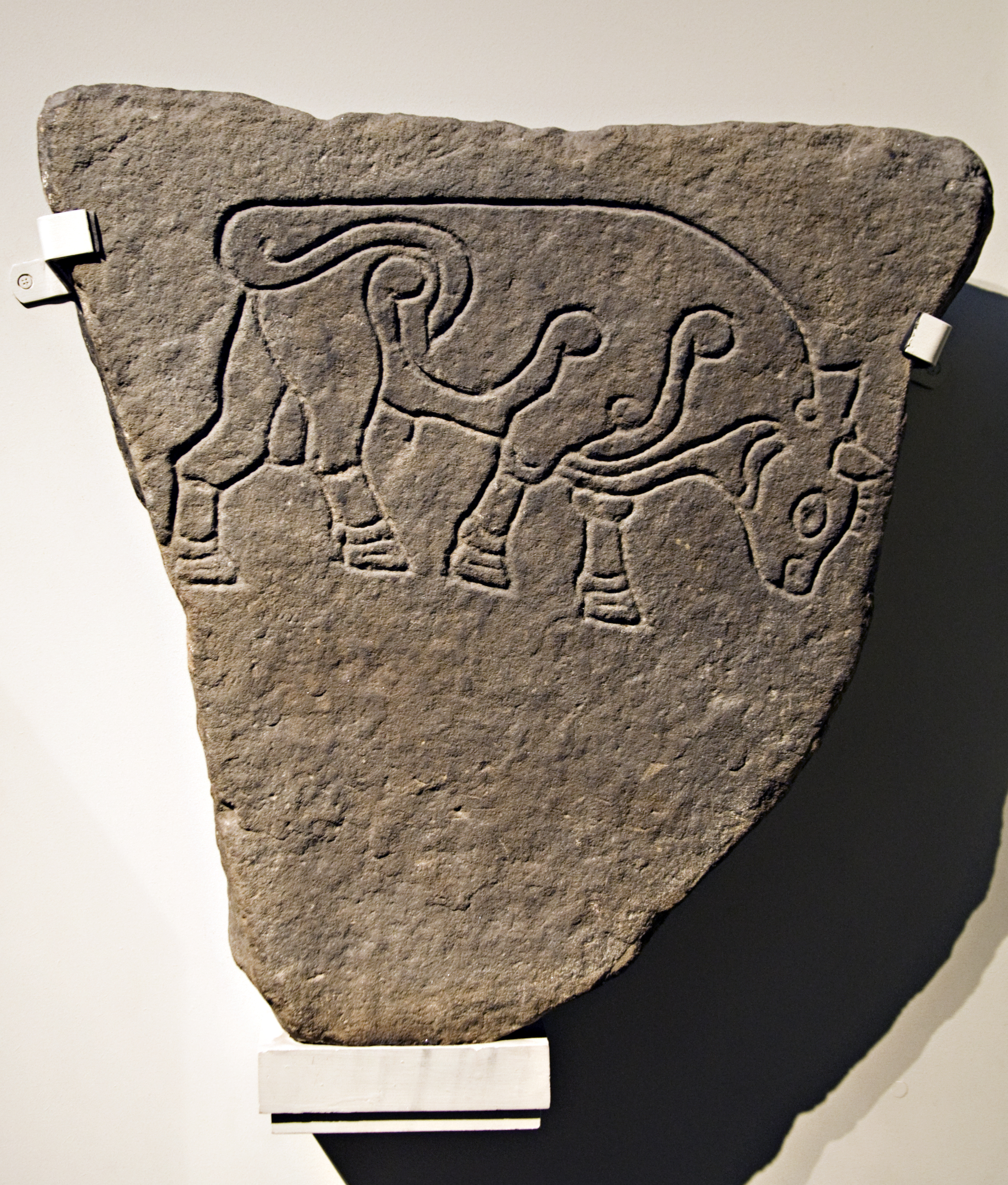
One of the Burghead Bulls at the British Museum

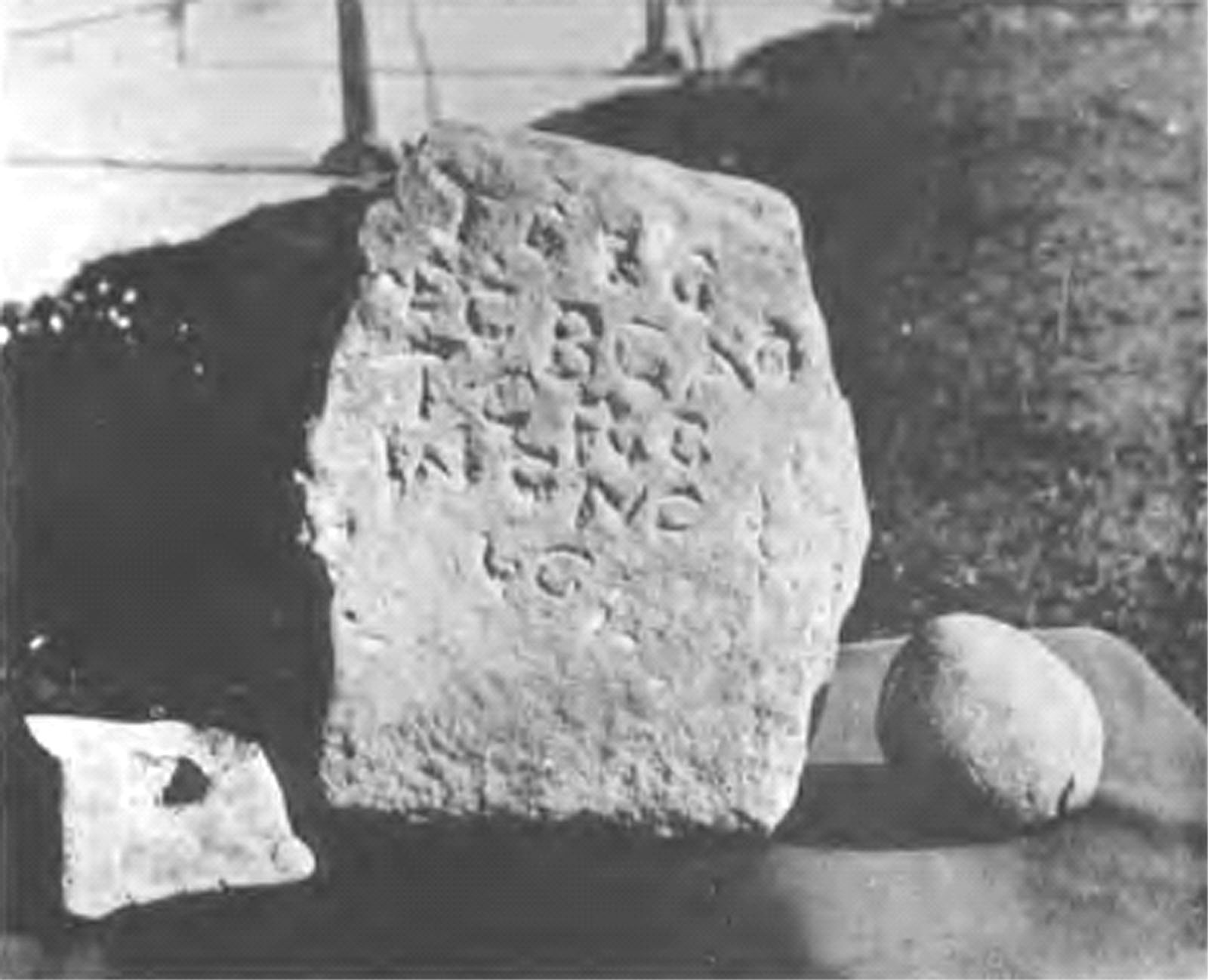
Inscription stone at Burghead.

=== Pictish fort ===
This vitrified fort lies on top of a headland which commands extensive views of the Moray Firth. Originally believed to be Ptolemy's Castra Alata, later 'Ptoroton' and the 'Torffness' of the Orkneyinga Saga, it is now known to be of Pictish origin and is thought to be the oldest Pictish fort. It encloses 3 hectares and is three times as large as any other fort of the same period in Scotland. It was defended on the landward side by three banks and ditches which were destroyed during the creation of the harbour and modern village; their age is therefore uncertain. Six striking carved slabs known as the Burghead Bulls were discovered during excavations. Dating to the 7th century AD, four of the originals are held locally in Burghead Visitor Centre and Elgin Museum and one each in the Royal Museum, Edinburgh, and the British Museum, London. Much of the fort was destroyed during the building of the village from 1805 to 1809. The Doorie Hill (see below), which marked the junction of the citadel and the bailey, is the only remaining piece of the southern ramparts. Lengths of the eastern and northern ramparts are also still visible.

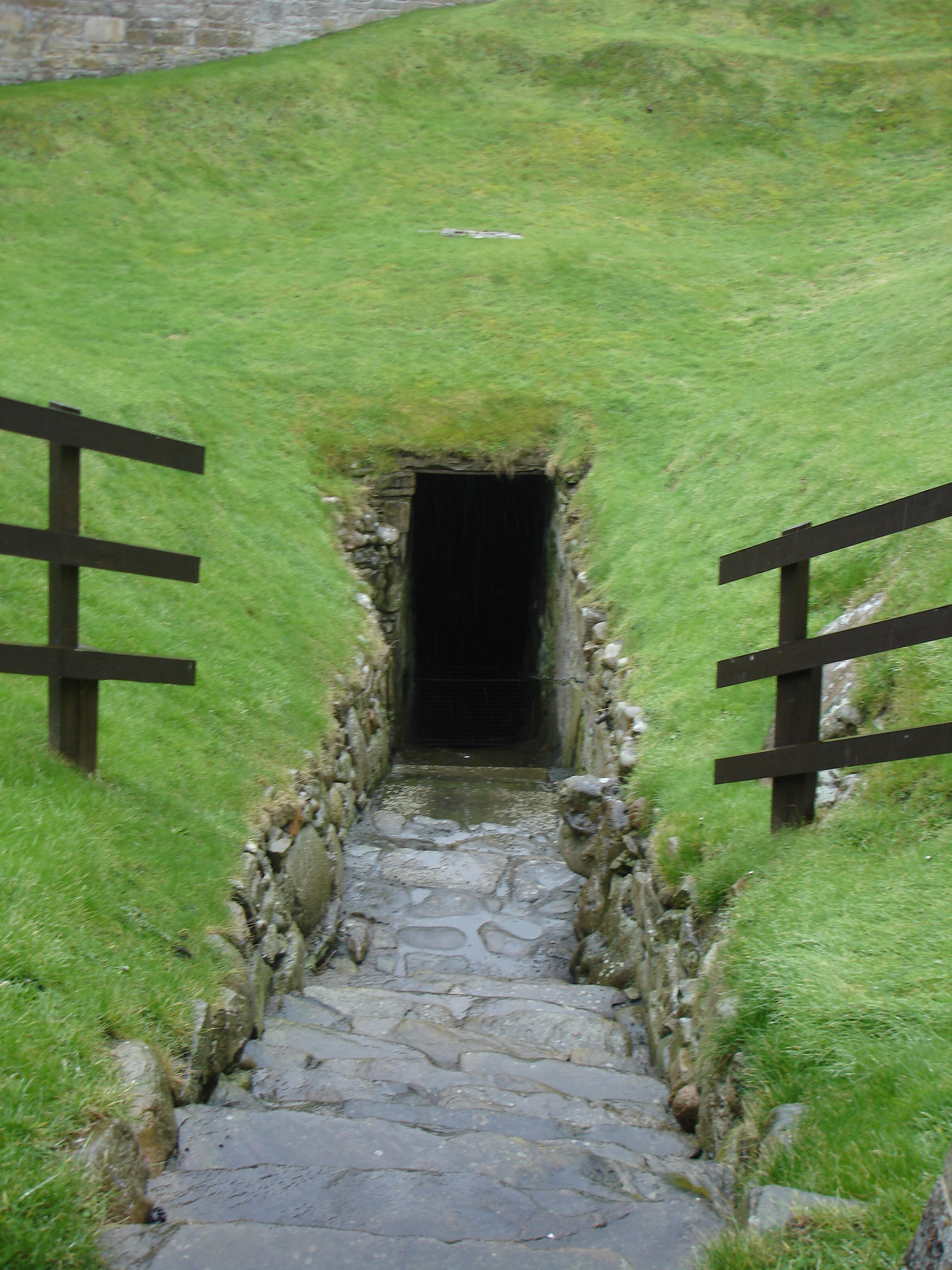
A view of Burghead chambered well from the approach (click to enlarge)

=== Chambered well ===
The Burghead Well, which lies within the perimeter of the promontory fort, was discovered in 1809. It consists of a flight of stone steps leading down to a chamber containing a tank fed by springs. There is a frieze in the upper walls, a pedestal in the southeast corner and a sunken basin in the northwest corner. The chamber is 11 feet (3.4 m) high, and 11 feet (3.4 m) across with a 4-foot (1.2 m) wide ledge around the edge, and the tank is 4 feet (1.2 m) deep. The discovery was made during excavations for a possible municipal water supply after an elderly fisherman recalled a tradition of a well in the vicinity. Various additions such as re-cutting the steps and deepening the tank were undertaken, but the flow of water proved to be insufficient for the proposed new function. At the time of discovery it was assumed that both the fort and well were of Roman antiquity and it was described as a 'Roman bath'. Later in the 19th century it was suggested that it was an early Christian baptistery possibly associated with the cult of St Aethan, but its origins remain obscure to this day. It is almost certainly of Dark Age provenance and clearly had some ceremonial significance. It is possible that its main purpose was as a water supply for the fort and may suggest a Pictish interest in water spirits. The well is a scheduled monument.

=== Burning of the Clavie ===
A fire festival called the Burning of the Clavie is held on 11 January each year, except when the 11th is a Sunday, in which case it takes place on the 10th. The event starts when the Clavie is lit on Granary Street at 18:00 and normally ends by 19:30.

In 1599, the Privy Council of Scotland made an order which provided that the first day of the year would be 1 January with effect from 1 January 1600, while retaining the Julian calendar. With the Calendar (New Style) Act 1750, Great Britain, including Scotland, adopted the Gregorian calendar and elided 11 days from the 1752 calendar. Thus the day that would have been New Year's Day in the old calendar now fell on 12 January of the new calendar. The Burning of the Clavie continues to be celebrated on "old" New Year's Eve—that is, in the new calendar, on 11 January.

The practice has survived clerical condemnation. On 20 January 1689, the young men of the village were rebuked by the church courts for "having made a burning clavie, paying it superstitious worship, and blessing the boats after the old heathen custom".

The Clavie is a barrel cut down to 17 inches (43 cm), which is filled with tar and bits of wood. It is nailed onto a pole which is 4 feet 6 inches (1.37 m) long with a specially forged nail. It has to be specially made to leave a space for the carrier's head to fit between the staves (6 in all) and allowing him to rest it partly on his shoulders while he carries it. A group of about 15 men known as the Clavie crew, traditionally fishermen and headed by the Clavie king, take turns to carry the burning Clavie on a set route clockwise round the streets of the old part of the town. The Clavie crew stop to present bits of smouldering embers to certain households and the three public houses in the village to bring them good luck for the following year. There are also two set points where they stop to refuel. At the end of the route the Clavie is put onto a stone altar (which was not constructed until the 19th century) upon Doorie Hill, and more fuel is added, often setting the whole side of the hill alight in the process. The barrel eventually collapses and the blazing embers are scattered all over the hilltop before they are collected and given out for good luck, although it is said that in the past the embers were kept as charms against witchcraft, and to kindle the New Year's fire on their cottage hearth. It used to be customary to carry the Clavie round every boat and vessel in the harbour, but this part of the ceremony was later discontinued, presumably because it became impossible as the harbour became busier.

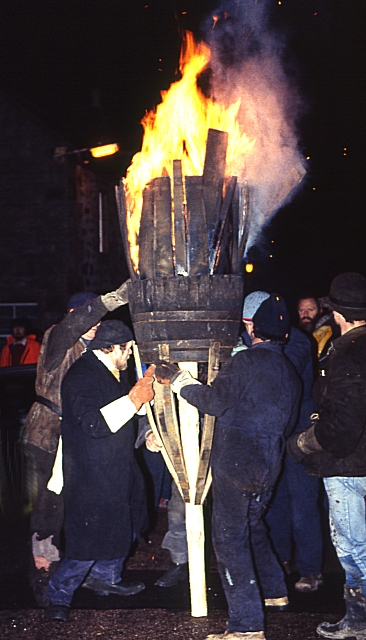
The Burning of the Clavie celebrates New Year's Eve, old style, which falls on 11 January (unless 11 January is a Sunday, in which case the celebration is held on 10 January). The Clavie is a half-cask, mounted securely on a pole, and filled with staves of wood and inflammable liquid.

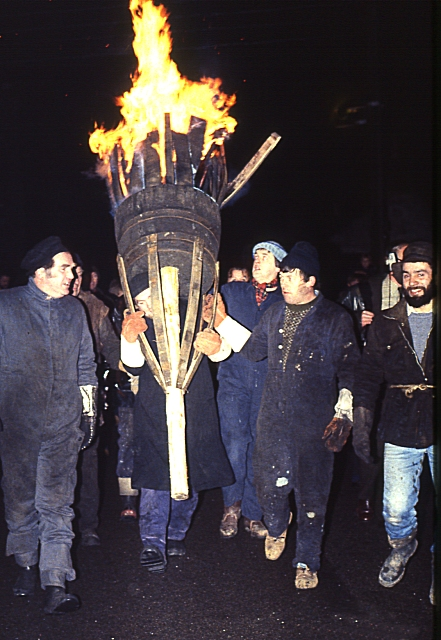
The burning Clavie is carried through the streets of the town by the members of the Clavie Crew, who must be natives of the town to qualify. It is followed by a procession of hundreds of onlookers. On the route through the town, the Clavie Crew hands pieces of the Clavie – smouldering pieces of wood – to householders to ensure good luck for the ensuing year.

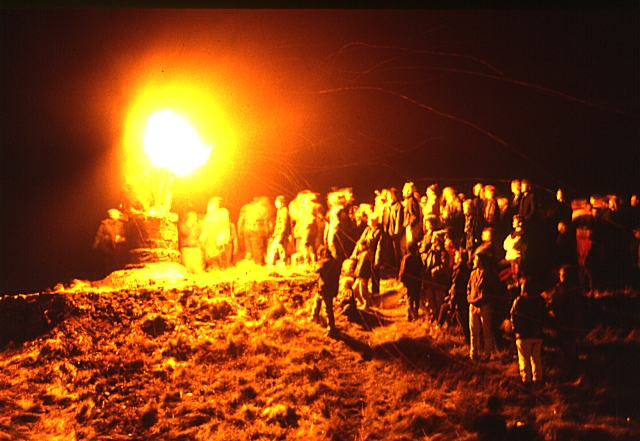
Finally the Clavie is carried to the top of the Doorie Hill and the pole is placed in a socket on top of the hill.

=== Ship building and fishing ===
Alexander Stephen founded his company Alexander Stephen and Sons and began shipbuilding at Burghead on the Moray Firth in 1750. For Reference A Shipbuilding History 1750-1932 Alexander Stephen & Sons Ltd. A Record of the Business founded about 1750, by Alexander Stephen at Burghead, and subsequently carried on at Aberdeen, Arbroath, Dundee, and Glasgow.

The following description from the Annual Report of the Fishery Board for 1902 provides an insight into the statistics for Burghead shown below: "The summer herring fishing at this creek was almost a complete failure; only a few of the older class of boats remained at home to follow after it. The fishermen do comparatively little fishing from their own port now. A splendid fleet of large-sized and well-equipped sailing boats is now owned at the port. In the course of the year an addition of three large-sized new ones were made to the fleet. It is the herring fishing that the fishermen mostly depend upon. During the year they are particularly fortunate, excepting at the Irish stations. One crew, however, earned £335 on the coast of Donegal in the short space of six weeks. They were very successful at Shetland and the Aberdeenshire stations. Sixteen crews participated in the remunerative season at the English herring fishing centres. Two local curers conducted operations at several of the southern ports. A large number of workers were drafted to these stations."

Fishery Statistics

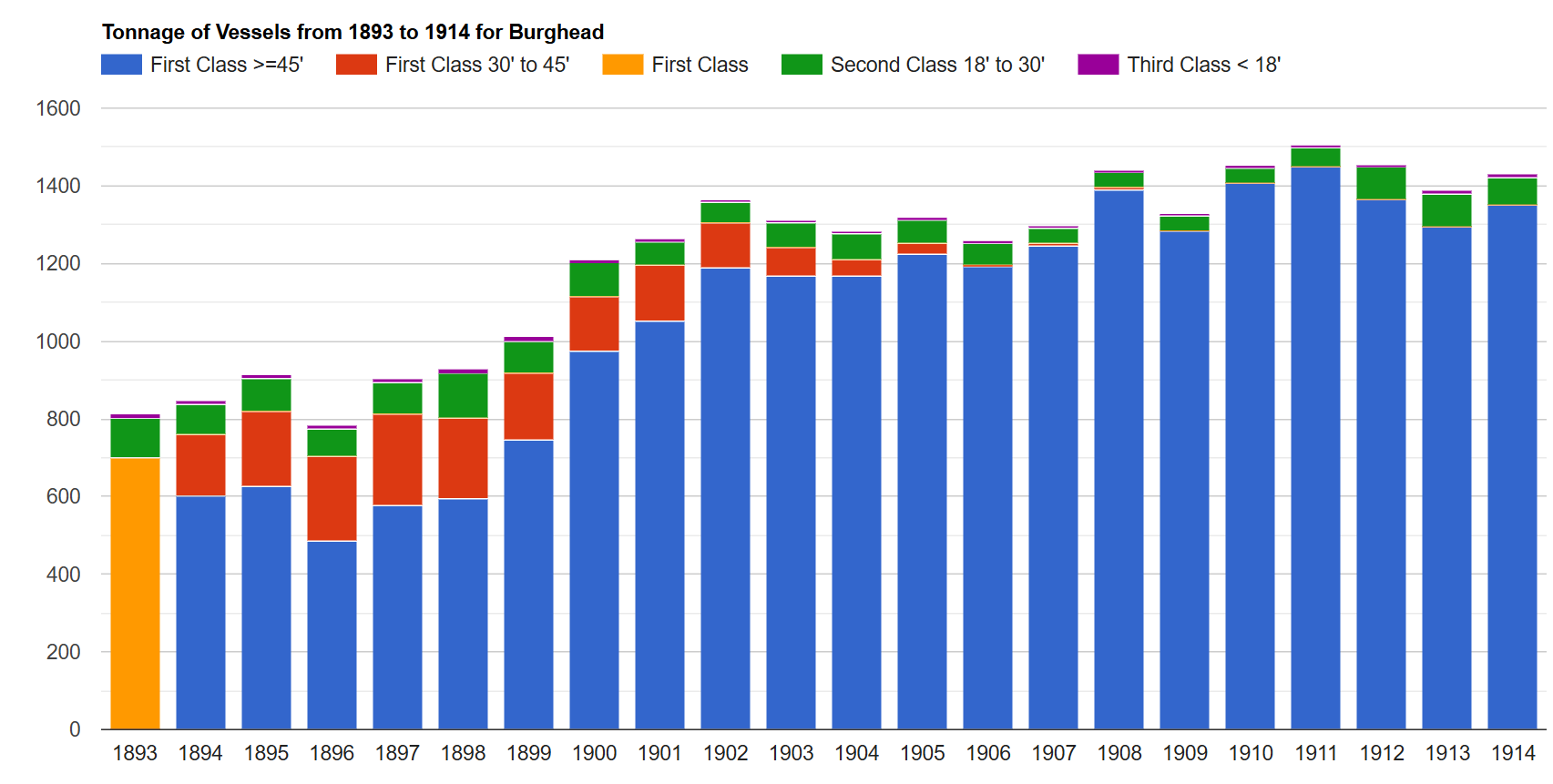
Tonnage of vessels

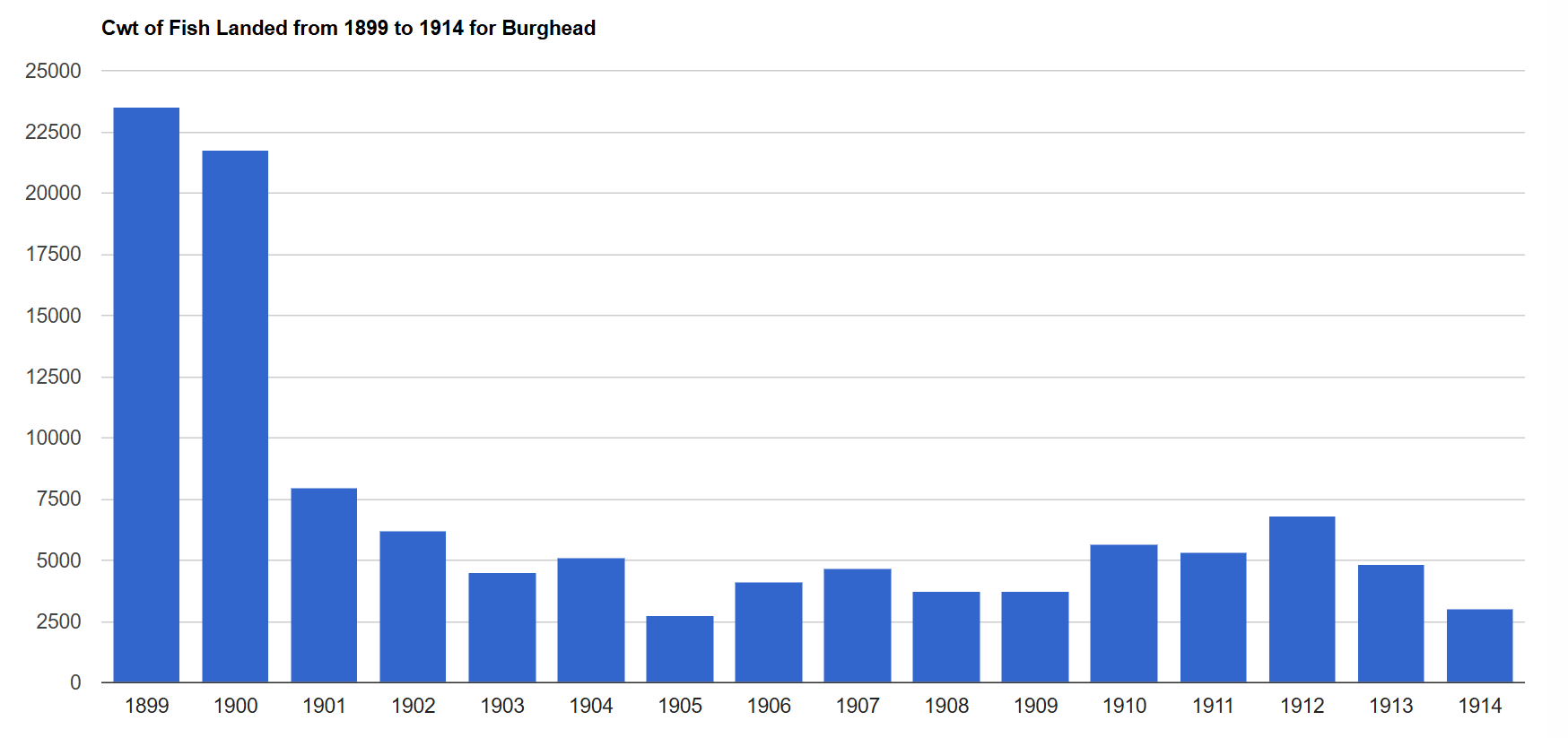
Cwt of fish landed (excluding shellfish)

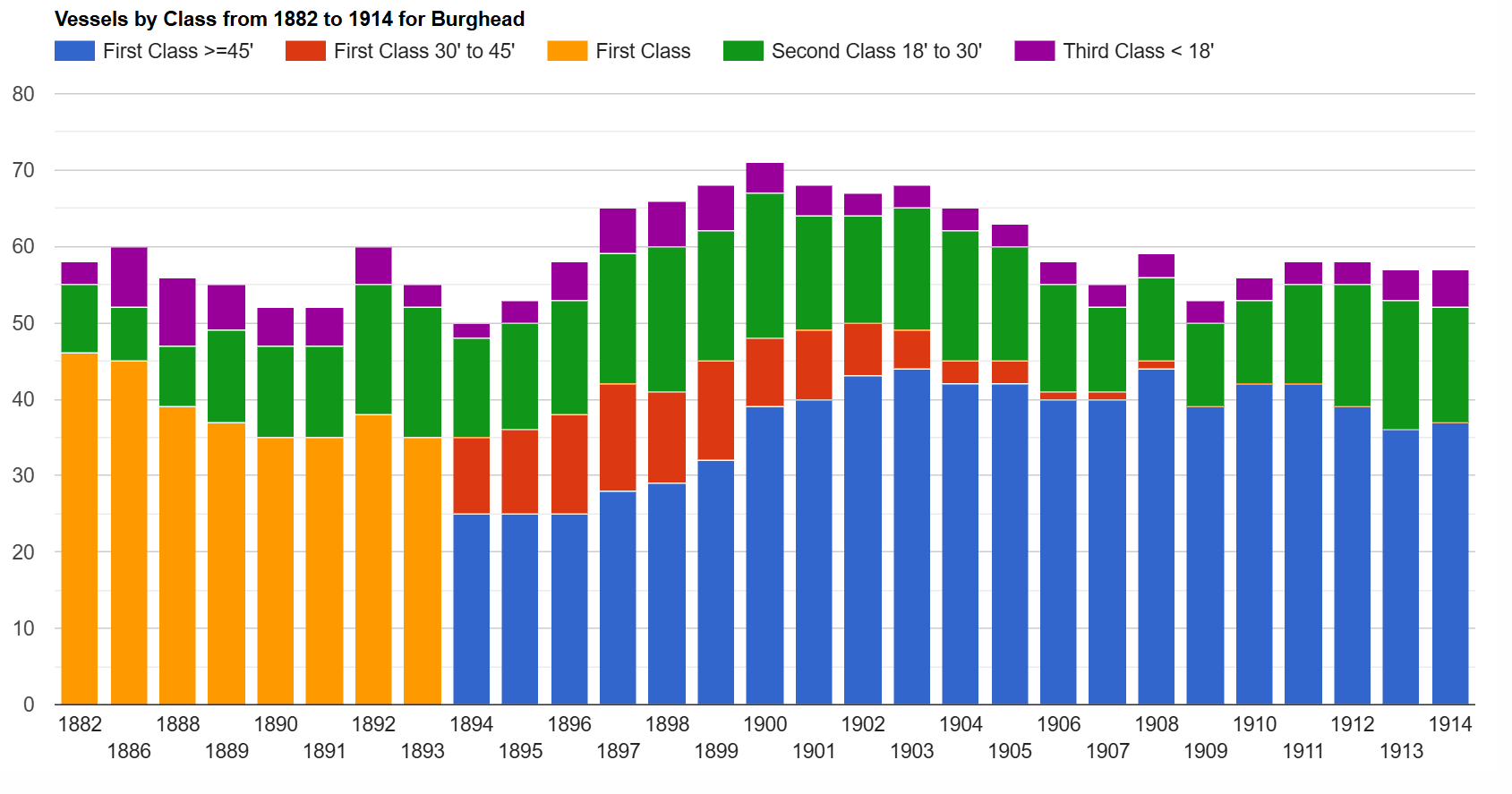
Vessels by class

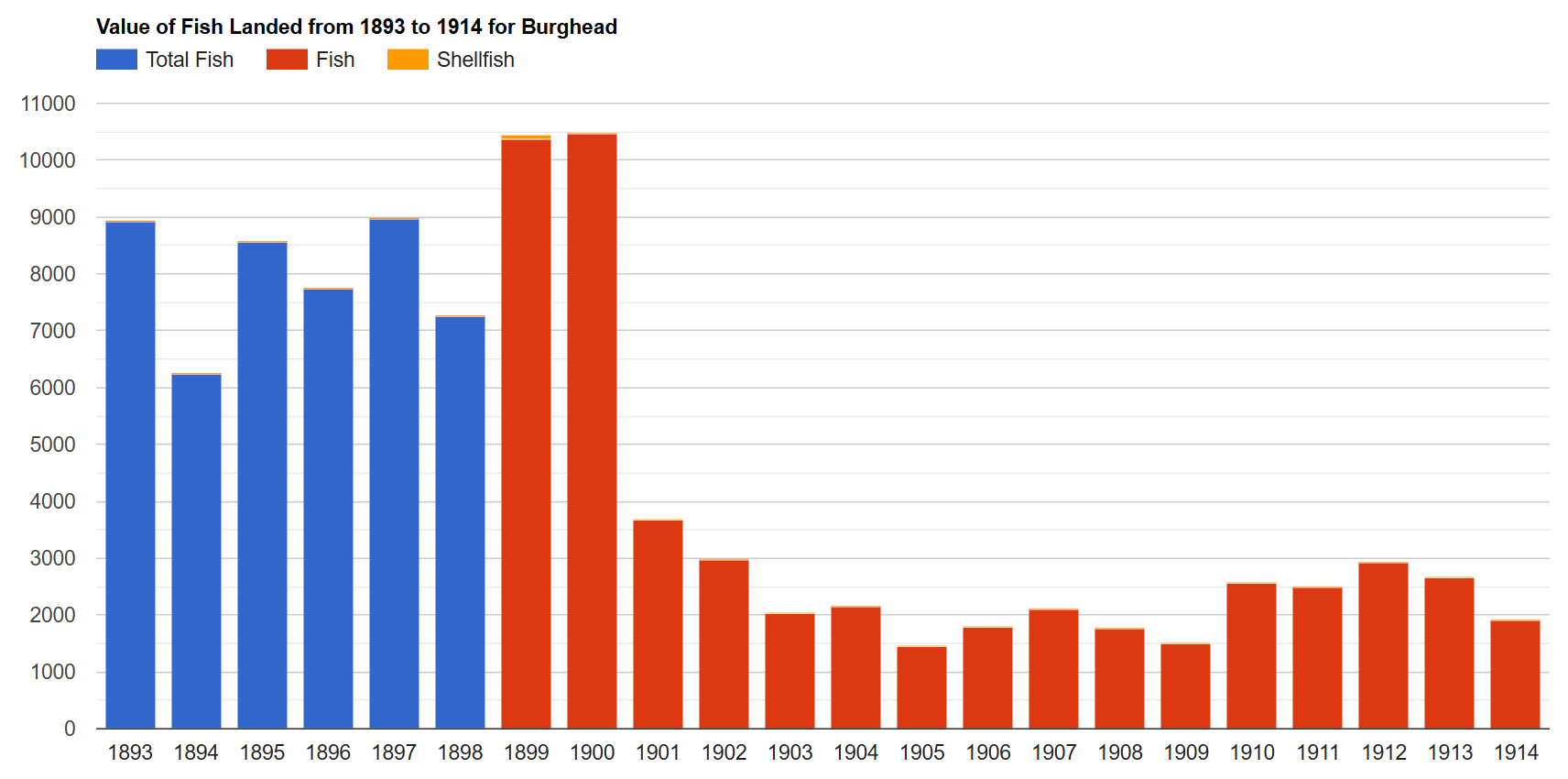
Value (£) of fish landed

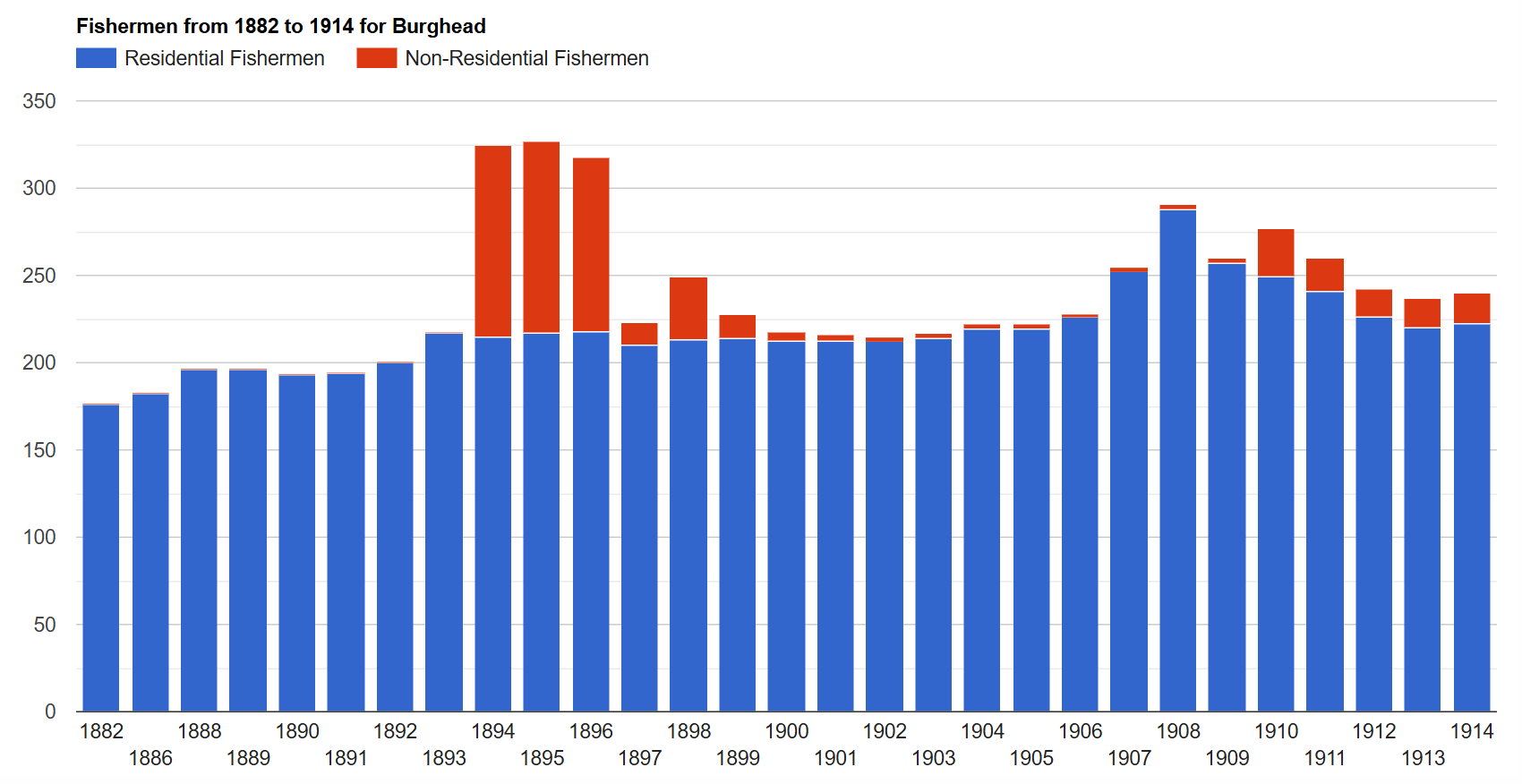
Fishermen

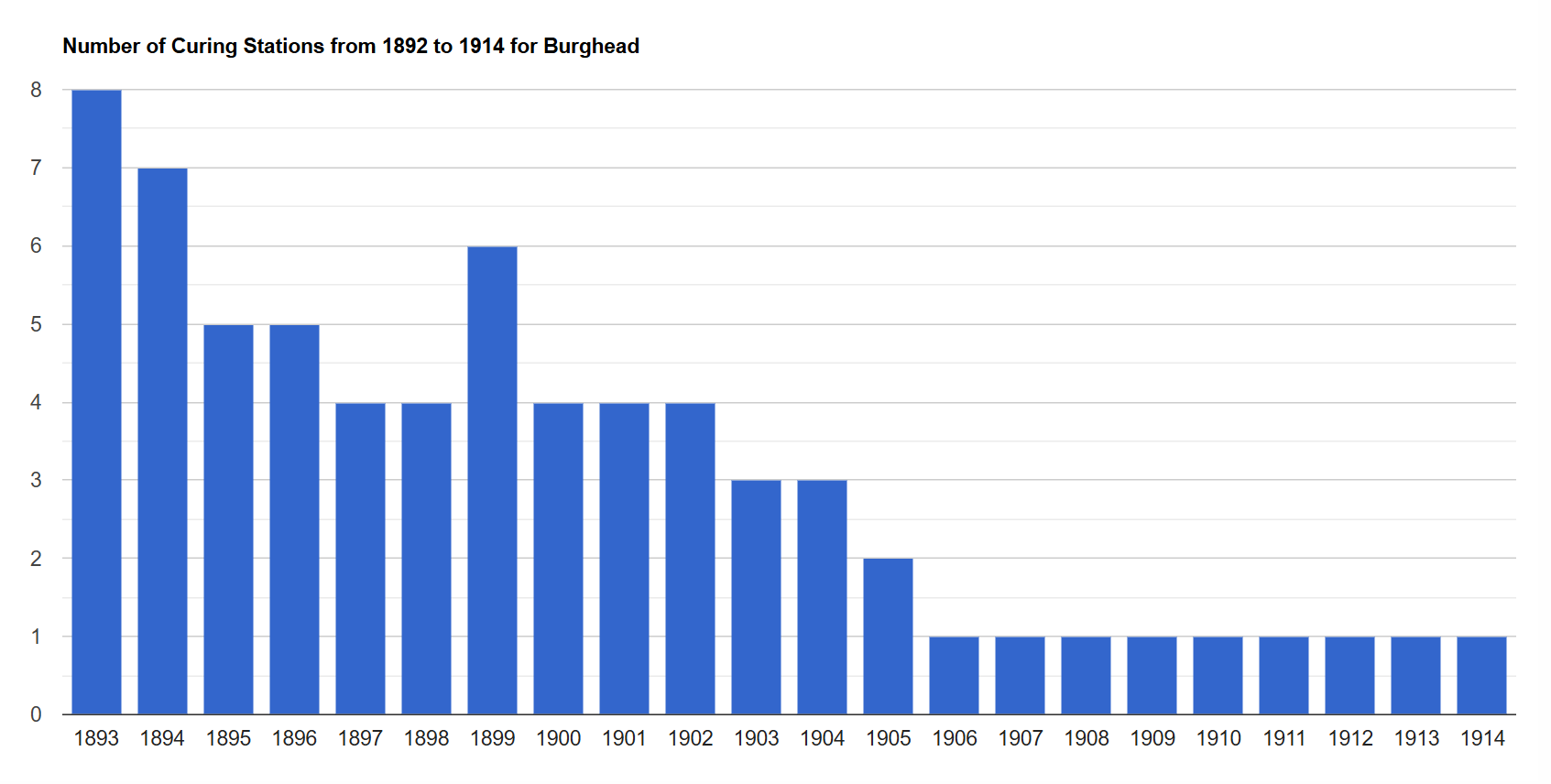
Number of curing stations

== Education ==
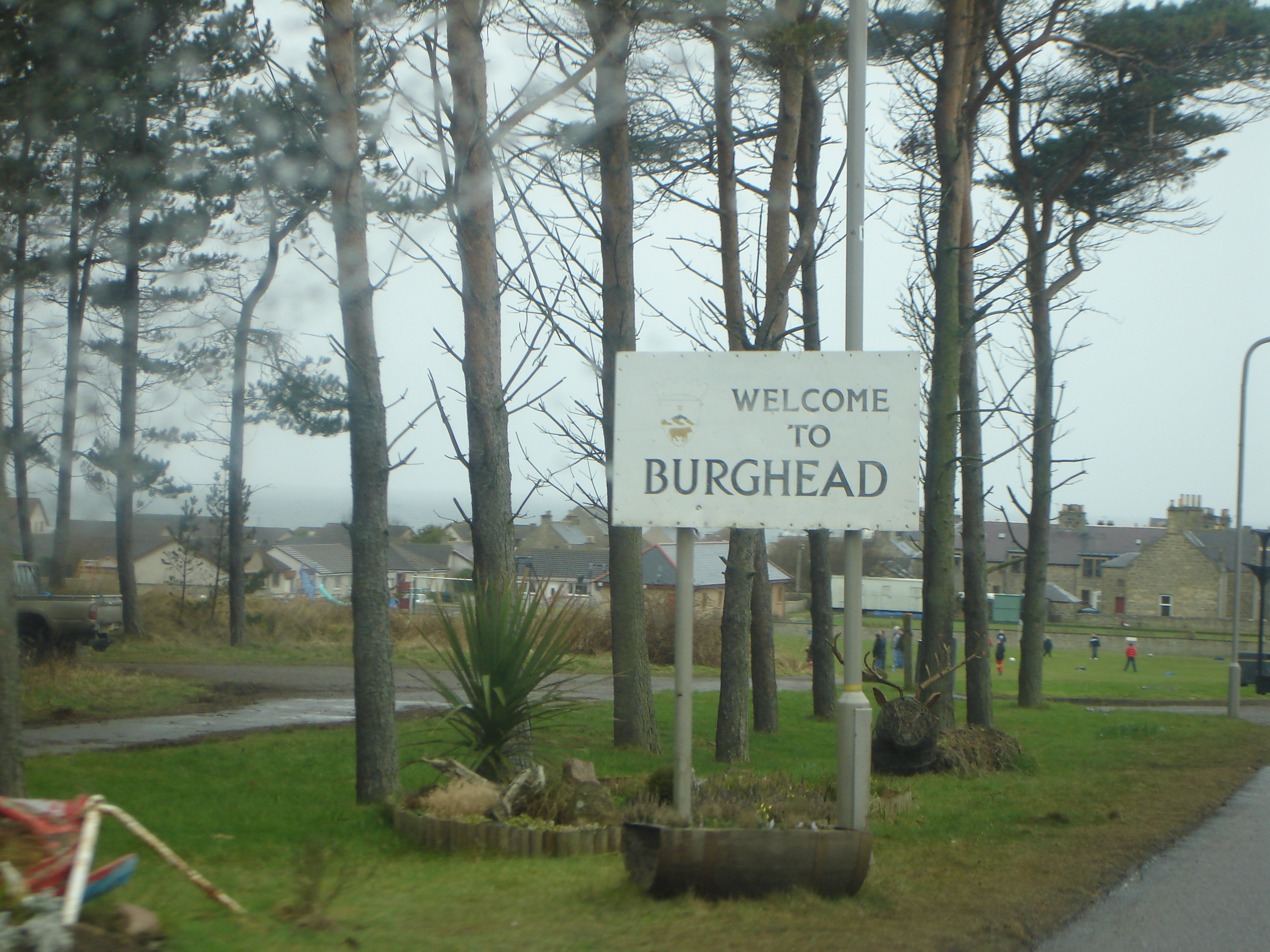
Welcome sign (click to enlarge)

=== Primary and secondary schools ===
- For primary education, there is just Burghead Primary School, a non-denominational primary state school in Grant Street in the centre of the town. The school educates in a nursery school and years 1–7. There is a school roll of 128. Students are grouped into three houses; Clavie, St Aethans and Torfness.
- For secondary education, free transport is provided to two schools in nearby towns. Students may choose to attend either Lossiemouth High School or Elgin Academy.

=== Further education ===
Moray College is located approximately 9 miles (14 km) away in Elgin.

== Notable people ==
- Rev Prof William John Cameron minister of Burghead Free Church from 1932 to 1950

== Politics ==
=== UK and Scottish parliaments ===
- Burghead is part of the Moray constituency of the Parliament of the United Kingdom which returns a Member of Parliament (MP) to the House of Commons, at Westminster.
- Burghead is part of the Moray constituency of the Scottish Parliament which has slightly different boundaries to the Westminster constituency. The constituency returns a Member of the Scottish Parliament (MSP) to Holyrood. The Moray constituency is also part of the Highlands and Islands electoral region which returns seven regional MSPs to Holyrood.

=== Local government ===
Burghead is represented at Moray Council in the ward of Heldon and Laich, from which four councillors are elected. The members elected from this ward as of the 2022 election are: James Allan (Scottish Conservative and Unionist), Bridget Mustard (Scottish Conservative and Unionist), John Cowe (Independent), and Neil Cameron (Scottish National Party).

Burghead was previously represented at Moray Council by the Burghsea ward from which one councillor was elected under the first past the post electoral system. Since 3 May 2007 the STV electoral system has been used in local elections throughout Scotland, which means that Burghead is represented by several councillors in the significantly larger Heldon & Laich ward.

== Population (demography) ==
The town had a population of 829 in 1841. The population of Burghead in 1991 according to the 1991 Census was 1,495. Data from the 2001 Census showed Burghead's population had risen to 1,640; however, mid-2004 estimates showed the population had risen again slightly to 1,680. The 2001 data makes Burghead the eighth-largest town in Moray behind Keith, Kinloss and Lhanbryde but ahead of Hopeman, Dufftown and Fochabers.

Males in Burghead make up 53.6% of the population; this is higher than the figure of 49.97% for Moray which itself is slightly higher than the 48.05% for Scotland. Males in Burghead do not outnumber females nearly as much over the age of 25 as they do under 25, as the number of males per female is significantly lower over age 25 (1.05) than it is under 25 (1.45).

Population	Place of birth	Age structure	Religion	Ethnic group
Males: 871 (53.6%) Females: 679 (46.4%) Total:1,640	United Kingdom:96.46% Scotland: 74.51% England: 19.76% Wales: 1.34% Northern Ireland: 0.85% Republic of Ireland: 0.3% Rest of Europe: 1.71% Elsewhere: 1.52%	Under 16 years: 20.12% 16–65 years: 66.04% 65+ years: 13.84% 0–4 years: 4.94% 5–15 years: 15.18% 16–24 years: 9.63% 25–44 years: 32.93% 45–64 years: 23.48% 65–74 years: 8.54% 75+ years: 5.3%	Church of Scotland: 46.65% Roman Catholic: 5.3% Other Christian: 15.85% Buddhist: 0.12% Another Religion: 0.24% None: 27.32% Not answered: 4.51%	White Scottish: 76.65% Other White British: 20% White Irish: 0.55% Other White: 2.01% Indian: 0.06% Other South Asian: 0.6% Mixed background: 0.37% Other: 0.3%

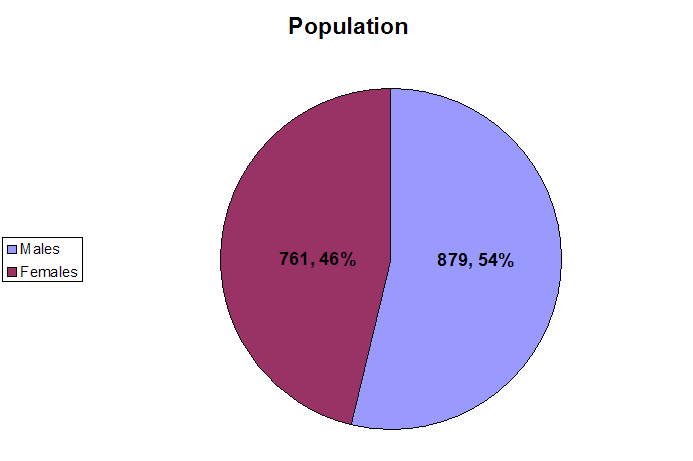
Population (click to enlarge)

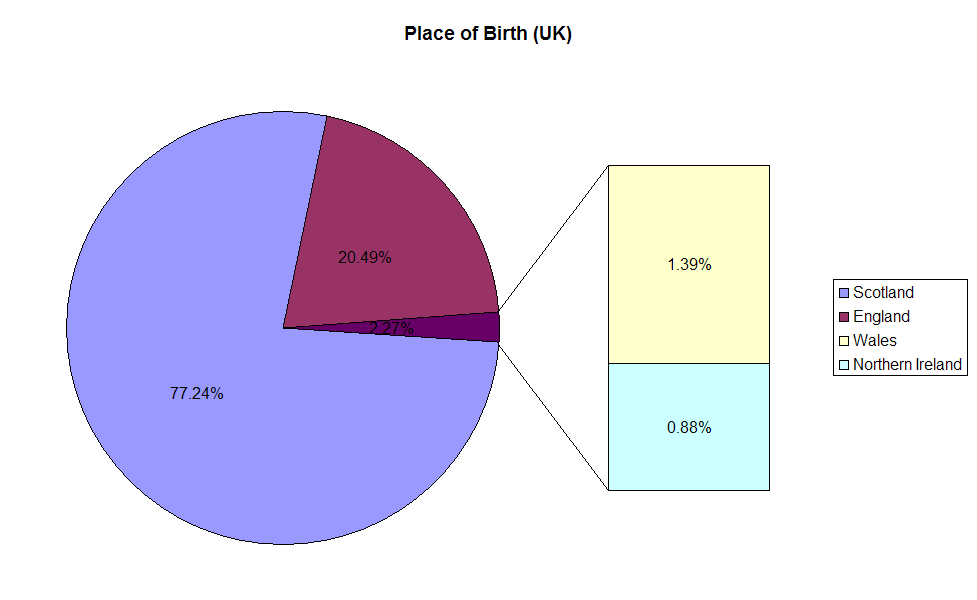
Place of birth – UK (click to enlarge)

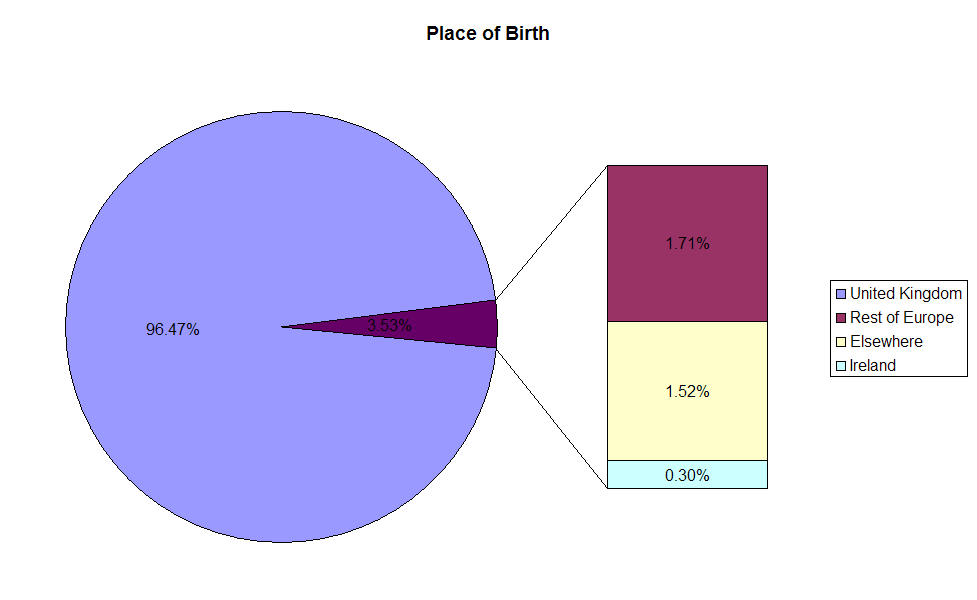
Place of birth (click to enlarge)

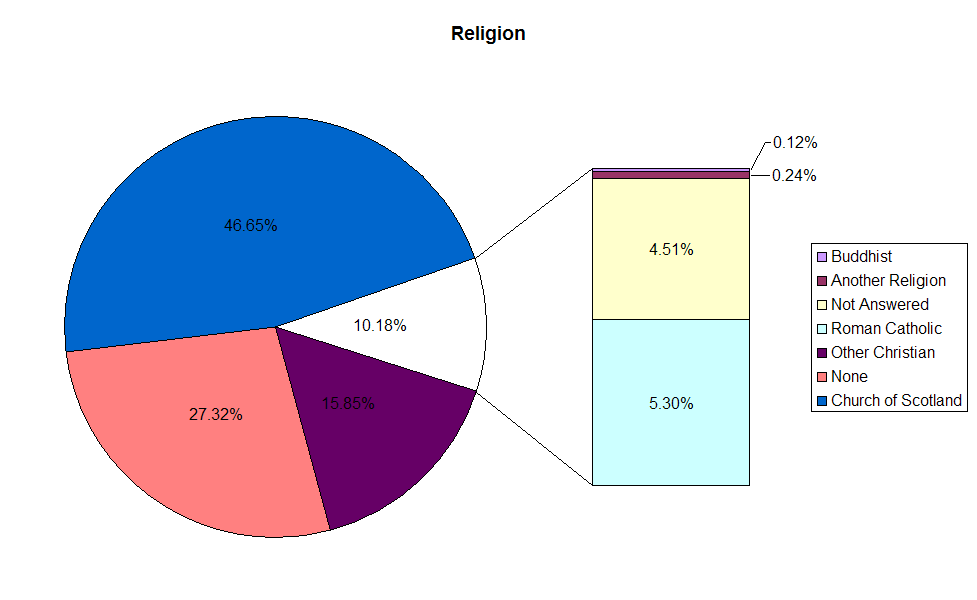
Religion (click to enlarge)

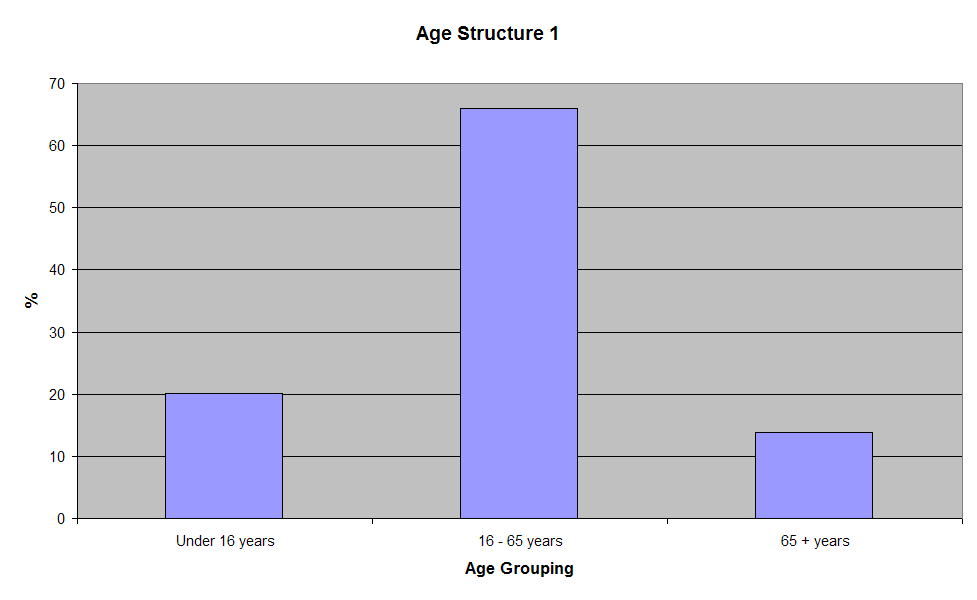
General Age Structure (click to enlarge)

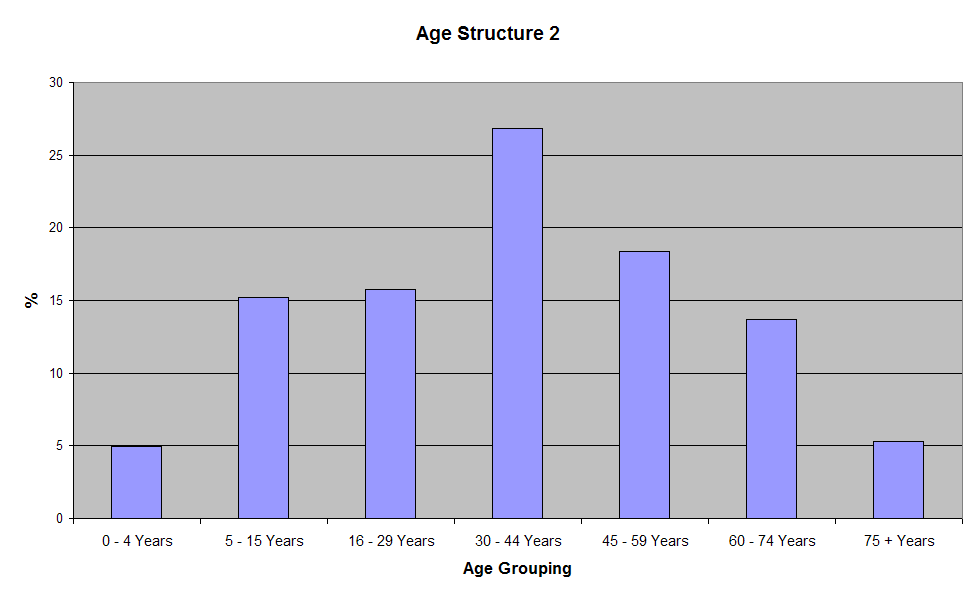
Detailed Age Structure (click to enlarge)

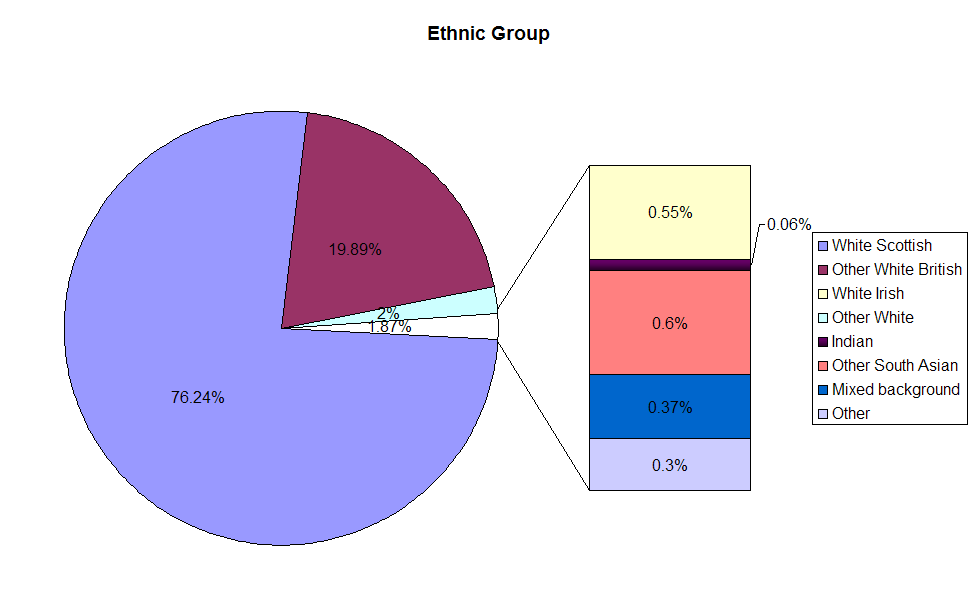
Ethnic Group (click to enlarge)

Sources: Scotland's Census Results Online, General Register Office for Scotland and Moray Council (2001 Census data)

=== Other facts ===
- Median age of a male: 36
- Median age of a female: 39
- Number of males per female (under age 25): 1.45
- Number of males per female (over age 25): 1.05
- Percentage of households where not all persons are in the same:
  - Place of birth category: 25.42
  - Religious category: 30.9
  - Ethnic category: 1.07

Source: Scotland's Census Results Online

== Economy ==
Sector of employment (click to enlarge)

Burghead and the Moray area in general are heavily dependent on RAF Lossiemouth, a Royal Air Force station, and Kinloss Barracks, a barracks for the Royal Engineers, which are located at roughly equal distances on either side of Burghead. Until 2011 Kinloss Barracks was also an RAF station, RAF Kinloss, and in 2005 the stations contributed £156.5 million to the Moray economy, of which £76.6 million was retained and spent locally. The stations have at one time been responsible for providing, directly or indirectly, 21 per cent of all employment in the Moray area.

Other sectors offering significant employment are local authority, construction and real estate, food and drink, transport, tourism, business services and wholesale/retail.

In the past fishing, particularly herring fishing, was a large part of the economy of Burghead. Langoustine fishing, mainly for the European market, now contributes little to the overall economy; in 2001, fishing accounted for just 2.12% of employment in Burghead.

There is a large malting plant located in the town and in 2009, a large modern distillery was completed at the junction of the Burghead/Kinloss B9089.

Just outside Burghead there is a large radio transmitter owned by Arqiva, the Burghead transmitting station.

Source: Highland & Islands Enterprise

== Transport ==
=== Roads ===
Three roads converge on Burghead, the B9013, the B9012 and the B9089. The B9013 connects to the A96 (Aberdeen to Inverness) and would generally be used to get to Elgin, the B9012 connects to Elgin via Hopeman and Duffus, and the B9089 connects to Kinloss and to the A96 via the B9011 (Findhorn to Forres).

=== Bus and train ===
- There is a regular bus service (32) which connects Elgin via Duffus. The service is operated by Stagecoach under the name Stagecoach Bluebird.

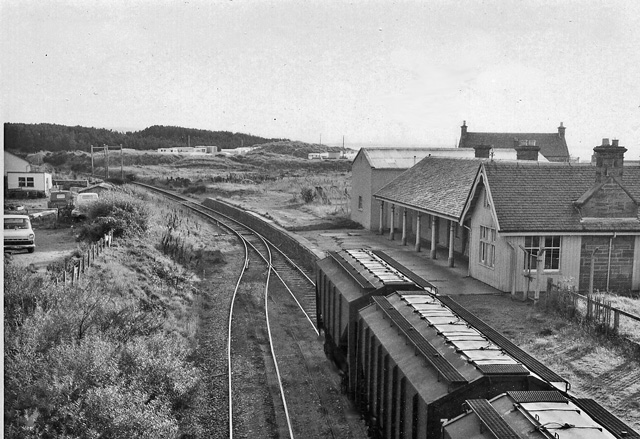
Remains of Burghead railway station in 1974

- The nearest railway station is approximately 9 miles (14 km) away in Elgin. The station is on the Aberdeen to Inverness Line and generally only offers services to Aberdeen (90 minutes travel) and Inverness (50 minutes travel), though more direct services are available. Inverness station and Aberdeen station then provide services to the rest of Britain. All train services within Scotland are operated by ScotRail, who operate the franchise.

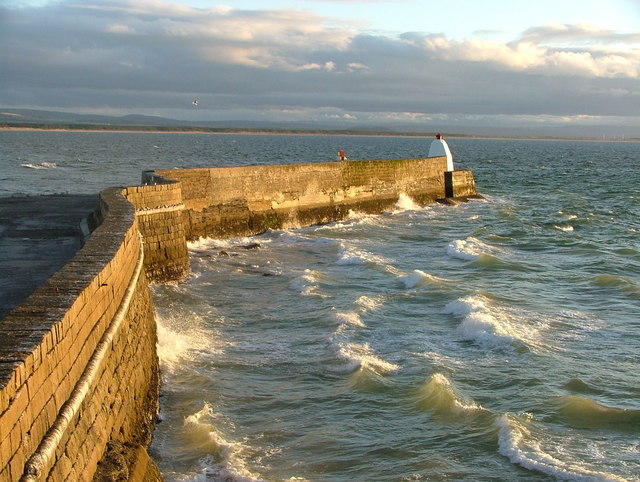
Harbour pier, looking towards Findhorn

=== Air and sea ===
- The two nearest passenger airports to the town are Inverness Airport (INV) at approximately 30 miles (48 km) and Aberdeen Airport (ABZ) at approximately 70 miles (110 km). Inverness generally provides services to the UK and Ireland whereas Aberdeen provides services to both domestic and international destinations. Aberdeen Airport is the second-largest helicopter terminal in the world and serves the many North Sea oil installations.
- Burghead harbour is mainly used by fishing boats and is regarded by Moray Council as primarily a commercial harbour but it is also used for recreational purposes. During 2007 the harbour's North Quay received a substantial upgrade, financed jointly by Moray Council and the European Union.

== Sport ==
=== Football ===
The town is currently home to two football teams: Burghead Thistle and Burghead United. It was previously home to another football team, the Burghead Anchors.

Burghead Thistle compete in Division Two of the SJFA North Region and play their home games at Forrest Park, just outside Burghead. In 2008 Thistle were awarded the Elginshire Cup without playing in a final after New Elgin and Lossiemouth United were both thrown out of the competition.

Burghead United compete in the Moray District Welfare Premier Division. United share a close rivalry with fellow Premier Division team Hopeman FC, based in the town of Hopeman about 2.5 miles (4.0 km) from Burghead.

Golf

Burghead & Duffus Golf Club was founded in 1896, permanently closing with the onset of World War II.
