= Cummingston =

Coordinates: 57.702°N 3.458°W

Cummingston: Scottish Gaelic: an Coileach; Scots: the Collach
- Location within Moray
- Council area: Moray
- Country: Scotland
- Sovereign state: United Kingdom
- Post town: ELGIN
- Postcode district: IV30
- Dialling code: 01343
- Police: Scotland
- Fire: Scottish
- Ambulance: Scottish

Cummingston is located in Moray on the north-east coast of Scotland. It lies on the B9012, sandwiched between the two fishing villages of Hopeman and Burghead. It was known as "the Collach", possibly from Scottish Gaelic an Coileach meaning "eddy".

== Features ==
Essentially a linear village less than a kilometre in length, only three streets form Cummingston; Main Street, Back Street and the more recently constructed Seaview Road. Where Back Street and Seaview Road join, a lane leads north to a small car park serving the children's play park. A footpath provides onward access down to the beach and connects to the Moray Coastal Trail network. It also lends access to the wells which provided the village's water supply in times past. Halfway through the village, on the north side of Main Street lies a war memorial in commemoration of local men who fought in the two world wars. There are around 85 houses in the village and significantly almost all have names instead of numbers. Cummingston's raised location means the majority of the properties have a view of the Moray Firth.

== Geography ==
The village sits approximately 150 metres south from the mainly rocky shore at an elevation of around 40 metres. The ground to the south is set in farmland and rises to around 60 metres, providing extensive views of the Moray coastline, the Moray Firth and the Highland region to the north. Separated to the west from Burghead by farmland and from Hopeman to the east by a closed landfill site and further farmland, the Moray Council Local Plan seeks to retain the village's present small linear nature by preventing housing construction in these areas. Part of the foreshore is designated a "Site of Special Scientific Interest."

== Recreation ==
Cuts to the railway network in the 1930s led to the demise of the line connecting Burghead, Hopeman and Coltfield Platform to Alves railway station. The line ran just above the shoreline at Cummingston, which had its own station until 1904. Now part of the Moray Council's Coastal trail, the trackbed is now an excellent footpath laid in gravel, popular with walkers and cyclists. The cliffs at Cummingston are mentioned in many of the UK's climbing guides and are often used for tuition by Scottish climbing centres.
