= Heldon and Laich (ward) =

Electoral ward in Moray, Scotland

Location of the ward

Heldon and Laich is one of the eight wards used to elect members of the Moray Council. It elects four Councillors.

== Councillors ==
Election	Councillors			
2007	Allan Wright (Conservative)	Eric McGillivray (Independent)	John Hogg (Independent)	David Stewart (SNP)
2012	Allan Wright (Conservative)	Eric McGillivray (Independent)	Chris Tuke (Independent)	Carolle Ralph (SNP)
2013 by	Allan Wright (Conservative)	Eric McGillivray (Independent)	Chris Tuke (Independent)	John Cowe (Independent)
2015 by	Allan Wright (Conservative)	Dennis Slater (Independent)	Chris Tuke (Independent)	John Cowe (Independent)
2017	James Allan (Conservative)	Ryan Edwards (Independent)	Amy Patience (SNP)	John Cowe (Independent)
2022	James Allan (Conservative)	Bridget Mustard (Conservative)	Neil Cameron (SNP)	John Cowe (Independent)

== Election results ==
=== 2022 Election ===
Heldon and Laich - 4 seats
Party	Candidate	FPv%	Count					
Party	Candidate	FPv%	1	2	3	4	5	6
SNP	Neil Cameron	29.5	1,455					
Conservative	James Allan (incumbent)	27.0	1,331					
Independent	John Cowe (incumbent)	18.5	914	1,045				
Conservative	Bridget Mustard	12.7	629	639	885	898	947	1,150
Labour	Andrew O'Neill	7.7	404	489	512	526	725	
Liberal Democrats	Calum Cameron	4.6	228	307	326	337		
Electorate: TBC Valid: 4,936 Spoilt: 60 Quota: 988 Turnout: 46.3%

=== 2017 Election ===
Heldon and Laich - 4 seats
Party	Candidate	FPv%	Count						
Party	Candidate	FPv%	1	2	3	4	5	6	7
Conservative	James Allan	37.9	1,953						
Independent	John Cowe (incumbent)	15.3	789	1,044.9					
SNP	Amy Patience	18.9	976	995.9	996.5	1,013.9	1,110.3		
Independent	Ryan Edwards	10.5	541	662.1	667.9	706.01	769.04	788.4	1,169.5
Independent	Dennis Slater (incumbent)	10.2	527	657.6	662.8	692.6	760.3	778.2	
Scottish Green	James Mackessack-Leitch	4.7	240	286.8	287.8	346.8			
Liberal Democrats	John Mitchell	2.3	116	200.7	201.3				
Electorate: 10,737 Valid: 5,142 Spoilt: 44 Quota: 1,029 Turnout: 5,186 (48.3%)

=== 2015 by-election ===
Heldon and Laich by-election (1 October 2015) - 1 seat
Party	Candidate	FPv%	Count		
Party	Candidate	FPv%	1	2	3
Independent	Dennis Slater	41.1	1,323	1,382	1,775
SNP	Joyce O'Hara	31.1	1,003	1,054	1,100
Conservative	Pete Bloomfield	21.8	703	725	
Scottish Green	James Edward Mackessack-Leitch	6.0	192		
Electorate: 11,070 Valid: 3,221 Spoilt: 27 Quota: 1,612 Turnout: 29.3%

=== 2013 by-election ===
Heldon and Laich by-election (7 March 2013) - 1 seat
Party	Candidate	FPv%	Count				
Party	Candidate	FPv%	1	2	3	4	5
Independent	John Cowe	31.4	972	1,020	1,058	1,273	1,507
SNP	Stuart Crowther	26.9	833	844	891	960	1,005
Conservative	Pete Bloomfield	15.3	473	490	516	558	
Independent	Nick Traynor	13.5	418	459	496		
Scottish Green	James Edward Mackessack-Leitch	7.4	228	242			
Independent	Jeff Hamilton	5.7	175				
Electorate: 10,579 Valid: 3,099 Spoilt: 38 Quota: 1,550 Turnout: 29.7%

=== 2012 Election ===
Heldon and Laich - 4 seats
Party	Candidate	FPv%	Count					
Party	Candidate	FPv%	1	2	3	4	5	6
SNP	Carolle Ralph	20.0	797	807				
Independent	Eric McGillivray (incumbent)	18.4	735	828				
Conservative	Allan Wright (incumbent)	17.3	688	699	703	704	764	836
SNP	David Stewart (incumbent)	17.0	678	687	692	699	741	
Independent	Chris Tuke	14.7	584	659	670	670	764	922
Scottish Green	James Mackessack-Leitch	6.6	262	279	281	282		
Independent	John Gordon	6.1	241					
Electorate: 10,287 Valid: 3,985 Spoilt: 56 Quota: 798 Turnout: 38.7%

=== 2007 Election ===
Heldon and Laich- 4 Seats
Party	Candidate	FPv%	Count								
Party	Candidate	FPv%	1	2	3	4	5	6	7	8	9
SNP	David Stewart	21.0	1,646								
Independent	Eric McGillivray	15.3	813	886	905	945	957	1,002	1,062		
Independent	John Hogg	14.0	744	781	787	797	810	844	941	952	1,099
Conservative	Allan Wright	11.4	606	634	640	645	653	671	726	730	799
Independent	Chris Tuke	10.0	531	564	594	607	615	635	677	688	
Independent	Harry Halkett	6.7	354	399	401	418	502	621			
Independent	Eric Paton	4.8	254	311	315	326	366				
Independent	Des Donaldson	2.9	155	196	203	215					
Independent	Martyn Harris	2.2	114	126	141						
Independent	Neil Hutchinson	1.7	92	104							
Valid: 5,309 Spoilt: 81 Quota: 1,062 Turnout: 54.4%
