= Elgin Museum (Moray) =

Museum in Elgin, Moray, Scotland

Coordinates: 57.6491°N 3.3100°W

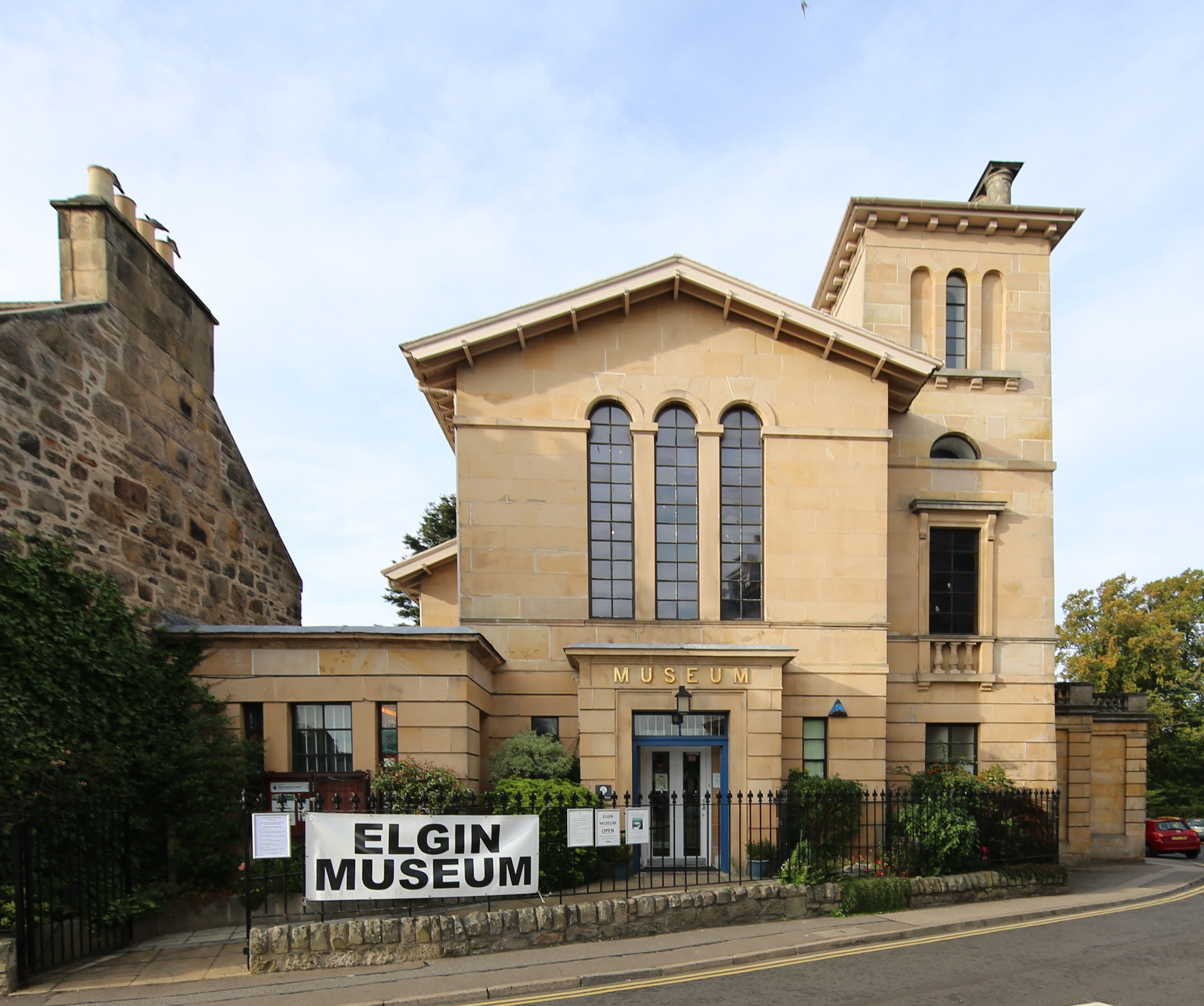
Elgin Museum

Elgin Museum is a museum of local history in Elgin, Moray, Scotland. Its collections cover local fossils and geology, archaeology, ethnography, art and local history. Opened in 1843, it is one of the oldest independent museums in the country. The museum is run by The Moray Society. Entry to the museum is free.

The museum is housed in a Category A listed building on Elgin's High Street. The building was designed by architect Thomas Mackie in 1842, with alterations and additions by A. Marshall Mackenzie and Son in 1920.

Its fossil collection is classed as a Recognised Collection by Museums Galleries Scotland. In August 2021, the bones of a 375 million-year-old predator discovered three miles away were put on display.
