= Moray District Welfare Football Association =

The Moray & District Welfare Football Association is affiliated to the Scottish Welfare Football Association which is affiliated to the Scottish Football Association. It has 13 member clubs and is sponsored by the Abbeyside Care Group.

== 2024 Member Clubs ==
- Aberlour Villa
- Buckie Rovers
- Cullen
- Craigellachie
- Hopeman
- FC Fochabers
- Lhanbryde United
- Portsoy
- RAF Lossiemouth
- Rothes Amateurs
- Seaforth
- Thunderton
- Ugie

== Champions ==
=== Premier Division ===
| Years | Premier Division | | | First Division | | | Mike Simpson Memorial Trophy | WJ Tewnion Memorial Trophy |
| Years | Winner | Runner-up | Third | Winner | Runner-up | Third | Winner | Winner |
|---|---|---|---|---|---|---|---|---|
| 2023 | FC Fochabers | Hopeman | RAF Lossiemouth | No League | | | FC Fochabers | FC Fochabers |
| 2022 | FC Fochabers | Hopeman | Aberlour Villa | No League | | | FC Fochabers | RAF Lossiemouth |
| 2021 | Buckie United | Hopeman | RAF Lossiemouth | FC Fochabers | Cullen | Portsoy | | |
| 2020 | cancelled | | | | | | | |
| 2019 | Hopeman | Buckie United | Burghead United | Cullen | RAF Lossiemouth | Tomintoul | Buckie United | Hopeman |
| 2018 | Burghead United | FC Fochabers | Bishopmill Rovers | Tomintoul | RAF Lossiemouth | Rothes Amateurs | FC Fochabers | Buckie United |
| 2017 | Hopeman | Aberlour Villa | Burghead United | Bishopmill Rovers | Buckie United | FC Buckie | Aberlour Villa | Hopeman |
| 2016 | Aberlour Villa | FC Fochabers | Buckie United | Ugie Youths | Bishopmill Rovers | New Elgin Welfare | | |
| 2015 | FC Fochabers | Bishopmill Villa | RAF Lossiemouth | Burghead United | Cullen | Elgin Athletic | | |
| 2014 | Ugie United | Portsoy | Bishopmill Villa | FC Fochabers | Hopeman | Elgin Athletic | | |
| 2013 | Rothes Amateurs | Portsoy | Bishopmill Villa | Mosstodloch | RAF Lossiemouth | Lhanbryde | | |
| 2012 | Bishopmill Villa | Rothes Amateurs | Tomintoul | The Broons | Ugie United | Buckie United | | |
| 2011 | Rothes Amateurs | Bishopmill Villa | Aberlour Villa | FC Buckie | Cullen | Buckie United | | |
| 2010 | Portgordon Vics | Bishopmill Villa | Aberlour Villa | Lhanbryde | Tomintoul | Elgin Albion | | |
| 2004 | Burghead United | Banff Rovers | Moray Social | Newmill | Buckie Youths | Brander Arms | Rothes A | Buckie United |
| 2003 | Lossie Sports & Social | Moray Social | Buckie United | Cullen | Rothes A | Hopeman | Portsoy | Cullen |
| 2000 | Burghead United | | | | | | | |
| 1999 | | | Burghead United | | | | | |
| 1997 | | | | | Burghead United | | | |
