= Hopeman =

Coordinates: 57°42′25″N 3°26′04″W

Hopeman: Scottish Gaelic: Hudaman; Scots: Houpmin
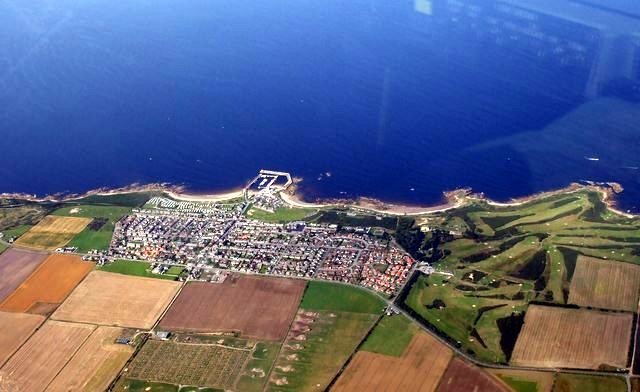
- Hopeman from above

- Location within Moray
- Population: 1,710 (2020)
- OS grid reference: NJ145695
- Council area: Moray
- Lieutenancy area: Moray
- Country: Scotland
- Sovereign state: United Kingdom
- Post town: ELGIN
- Postcode district: IV30
- Police: Scotland
- Fire: Scottish
- Ambulance: Scottish
- UK Parliament: Moray West, Nairn and Strathspey
- Scottish Parliament: Moray

Hopeman (Scots: Houpmin, Scottish Gaelic: Hudaman) is a seaside village in Moray, Scotland, it is situated on the coast of the Moray Firth, founded in 1805 to house and re-employ people displaced during the Highland clearances. According to the 2011 census, Hopeman has a population of 1,724 and approximately 701 households.

== The village ==
The village was founded around 1805 by Laird William Young of Inverugie who brought displaced Gaelic families from Campbelltown to establish a fishing industry in Hopeman. The settlement was expanded with the building of a harbour in 1865 by Admiral Archibald Duff of Drummuir. The harbour was used as a fishing port and Hopeman stone from the nearby Greenbrae and Clashach quarries were shipped from the harbour. The old part of Hopeman has a grid-iron street layout. The main part of the village is set back from the beach and there is a village green with playing fields, a playground and a skate park). The B9012 passes west to east to the south of the village.

The main street, Harbour Street, runs north to south from the harbour to its junction with the B9012.

During the summer months, the village organises a gala which runs for a whole week.

Hopeman Golf Course is to the east of the lodge and includes the famous 12th hole, named Prieshach, where the green is located within a cove named Clashach 100 ft (30 m) below the level of the tee box.

Phayrelands is to the west of the village on the main road towards Cummingston.

== Beaches and harbour ==
Hopeman has two large sandy beaches split by the man-made harbour. The West Beach is the smaller. The East Beach is surrounded by large, grassy sand dunes, and has colourful beach huts and large rocky areas with excellent rockpools (the one at the eastern edge is known as Daisy Rock). Further to the east is a smaller hidden beach with stones and large rock formations.

There are quite a few birds to be found on the beach, such as the herring gull, the great black-backed gull, the black-headed gull, the curlew and the oystercatcher. The areas of gorse heathland surrounding the eastern beaches are home to the whitethroat, the robin and the yellowhammer.

Now and then bottlenose dolphins turn up in the Moray Firth off the coast of Hopeman, from where they can easily be seen.

Hopeman Harbour is in between the East and West Beaches. It is small and now mainly houses pleasure vessels. In the past it was used for landing fish caught by fishermen from the village.

The harbour is home to the Gordonstoun seamanship department and, whilst the school's yacht is berthed elsewhere, the smaller craft used for sail-training are berthed here.

The marina in the harbour was installed by Moray Council in 2008.

=== Fishing ===
It can be seen from the following statistics that the landings of fish in Hopeman dropped off significantly in the years leading up to the First World War, and an explanation is given in the Annual Report of the Fishery Board for 1908: "Fising [is] carried out by old men and boys. Able-bodied proceed to chief herring fishing centres". The widespread adoption of steam drifters resulted in increased overall mobility.

Fishery Statistics

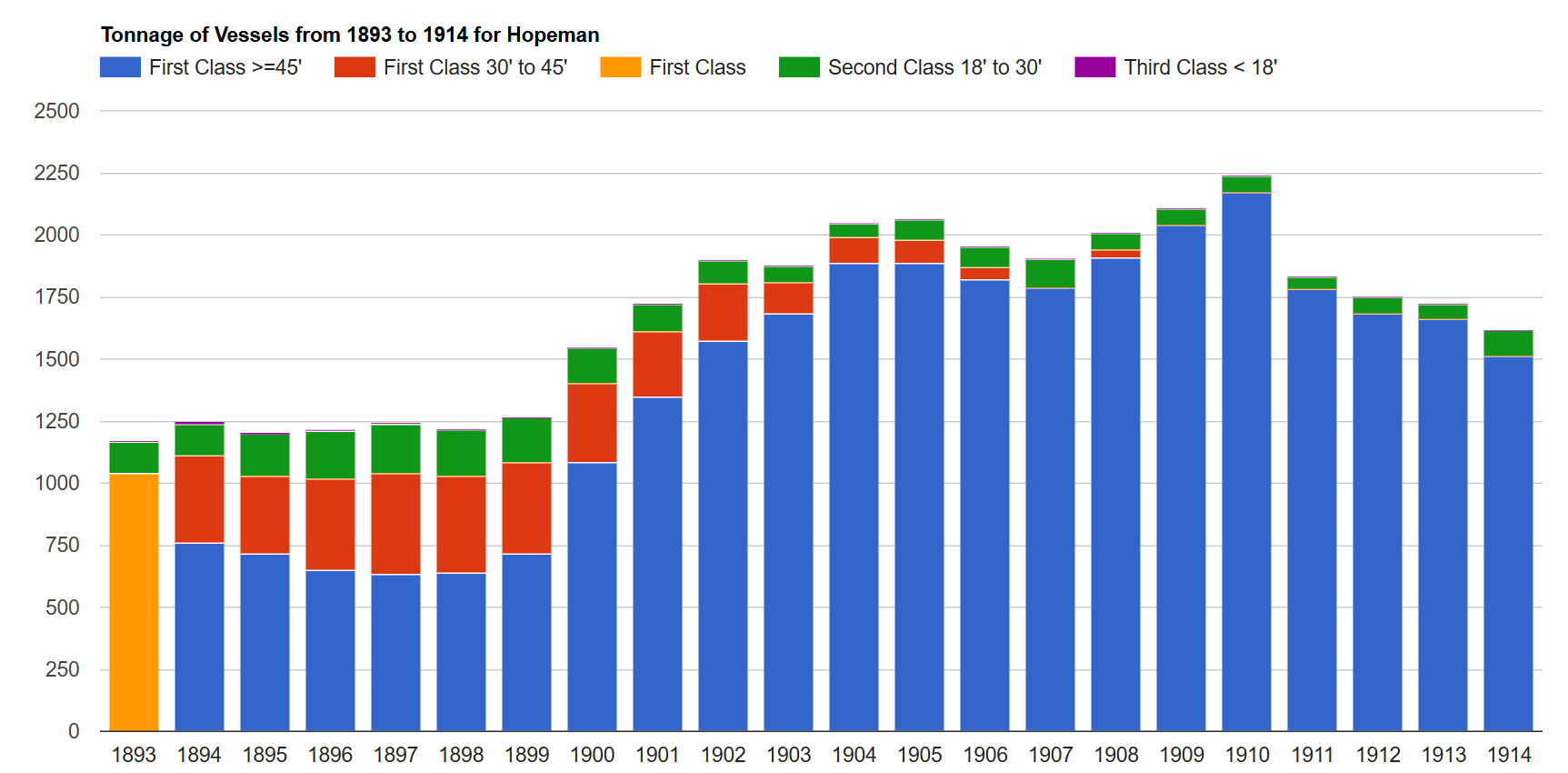
Tonnage of vessels

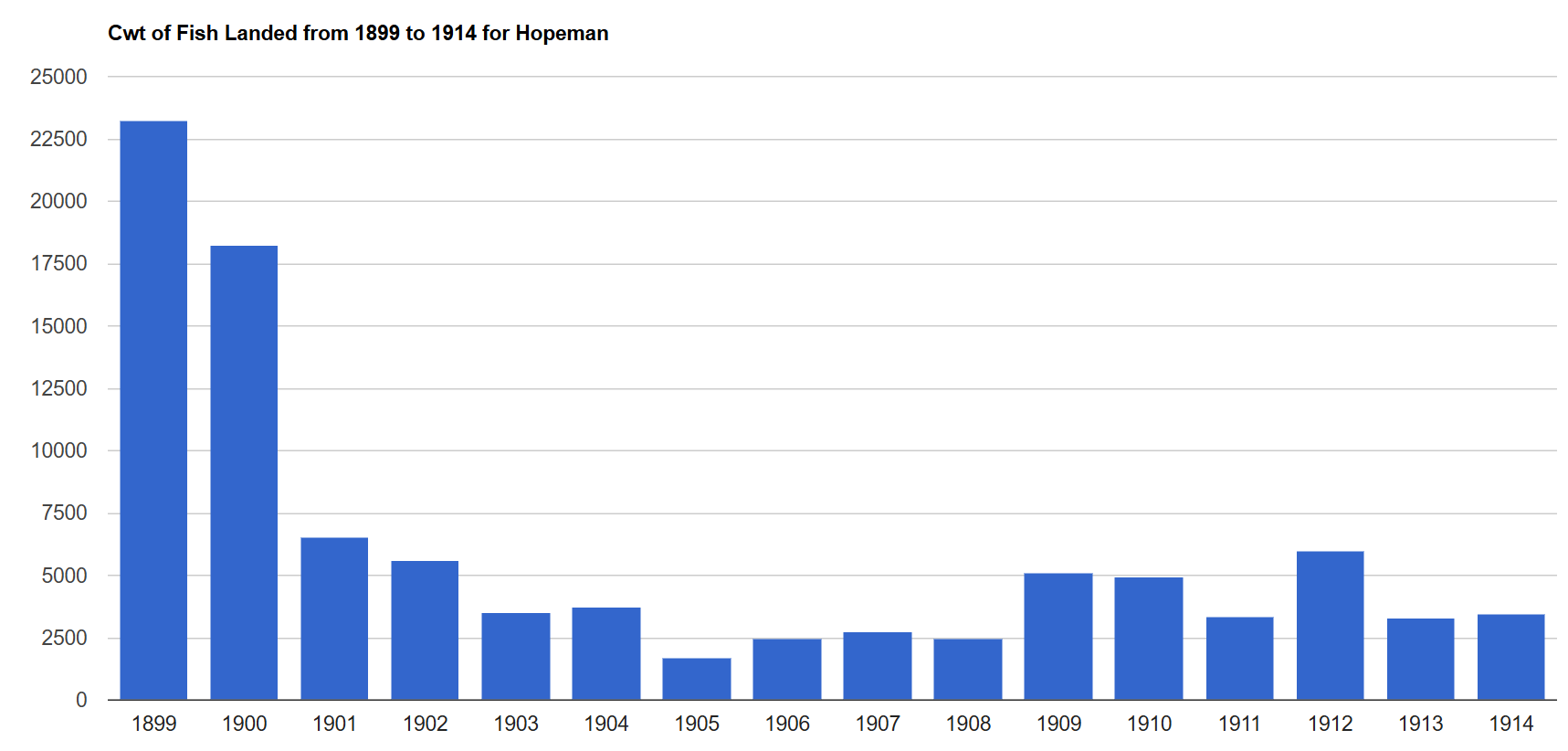
Cwt of fish landed

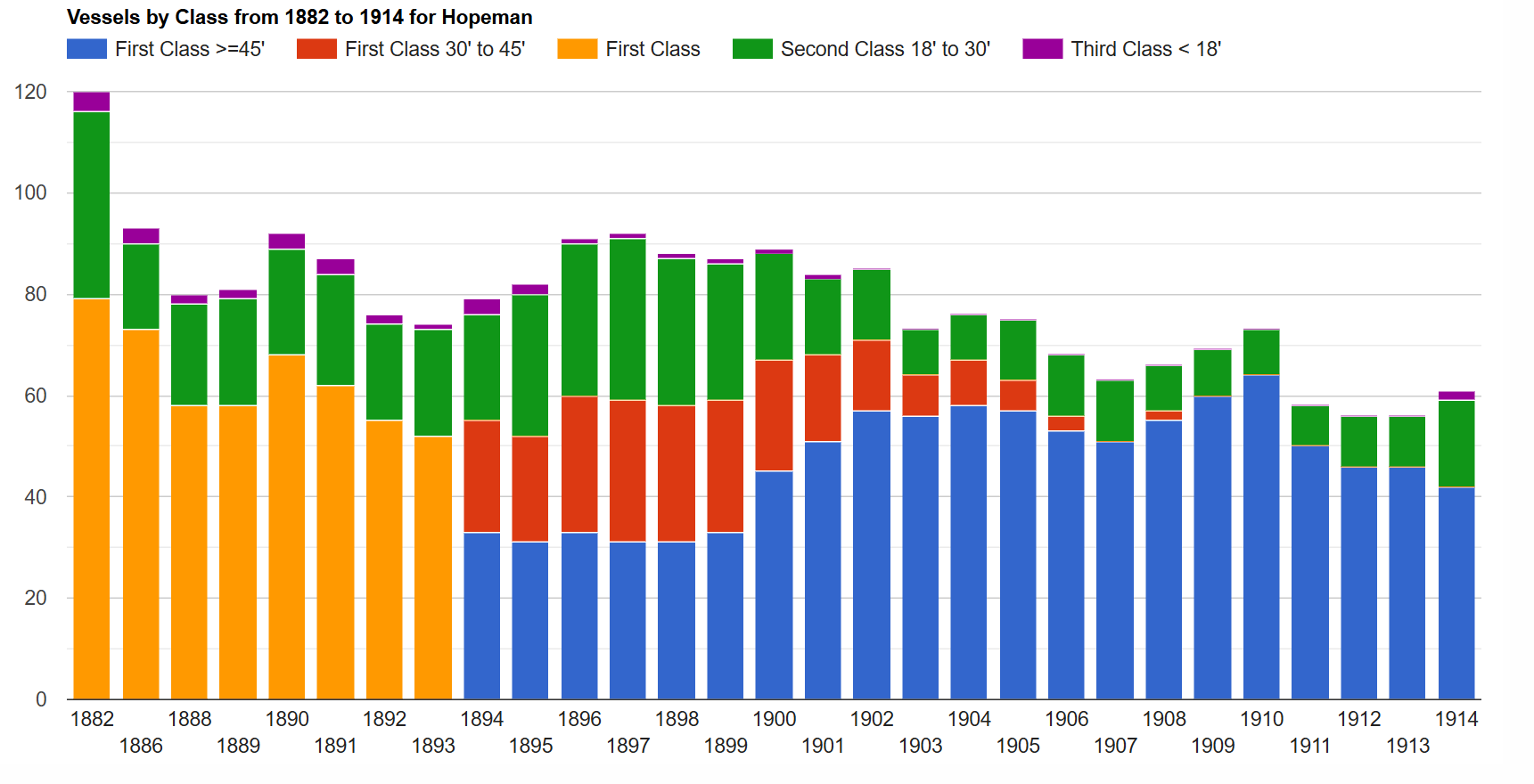
Vessels by class

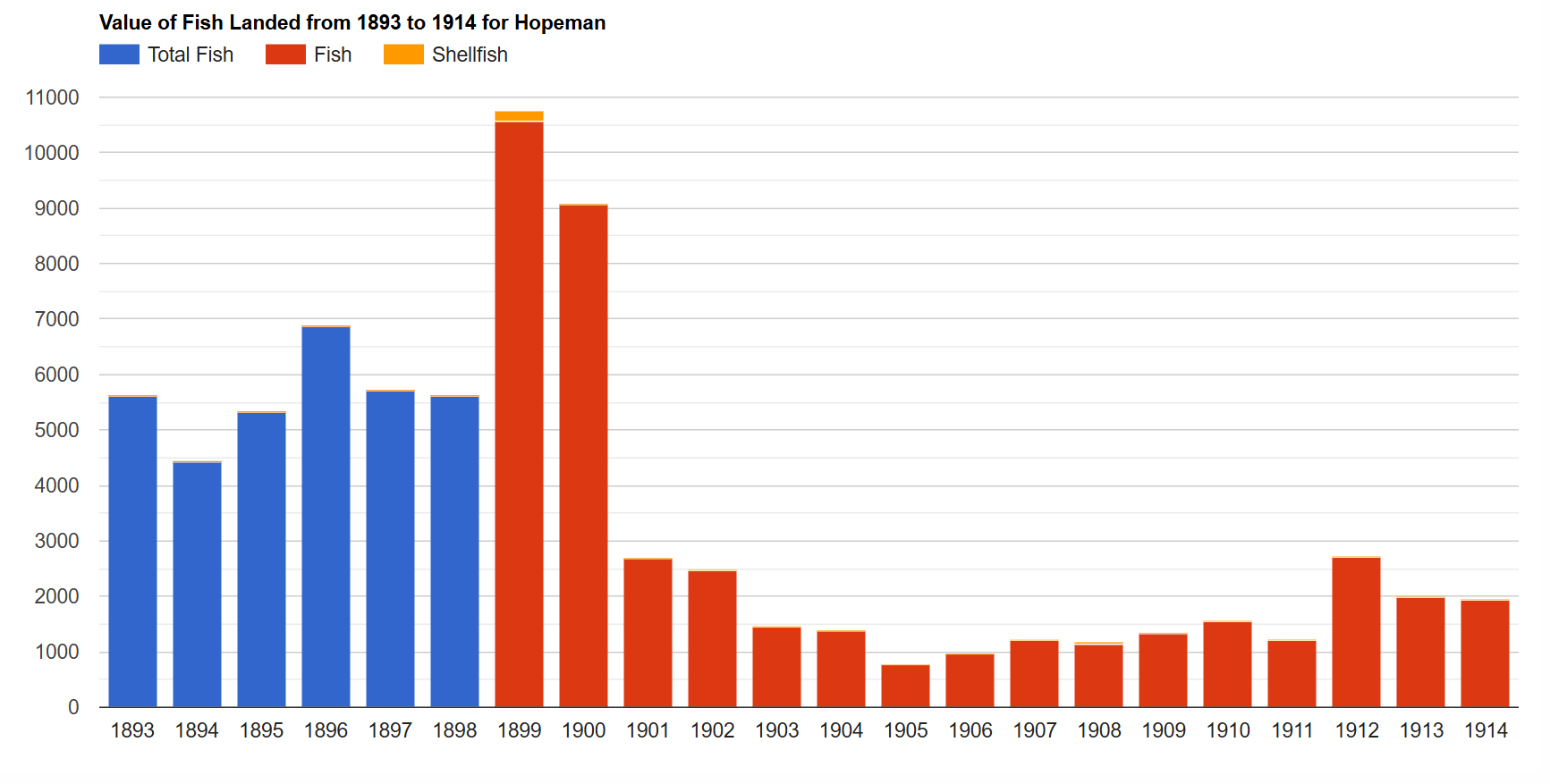
Value (£) of fish landed

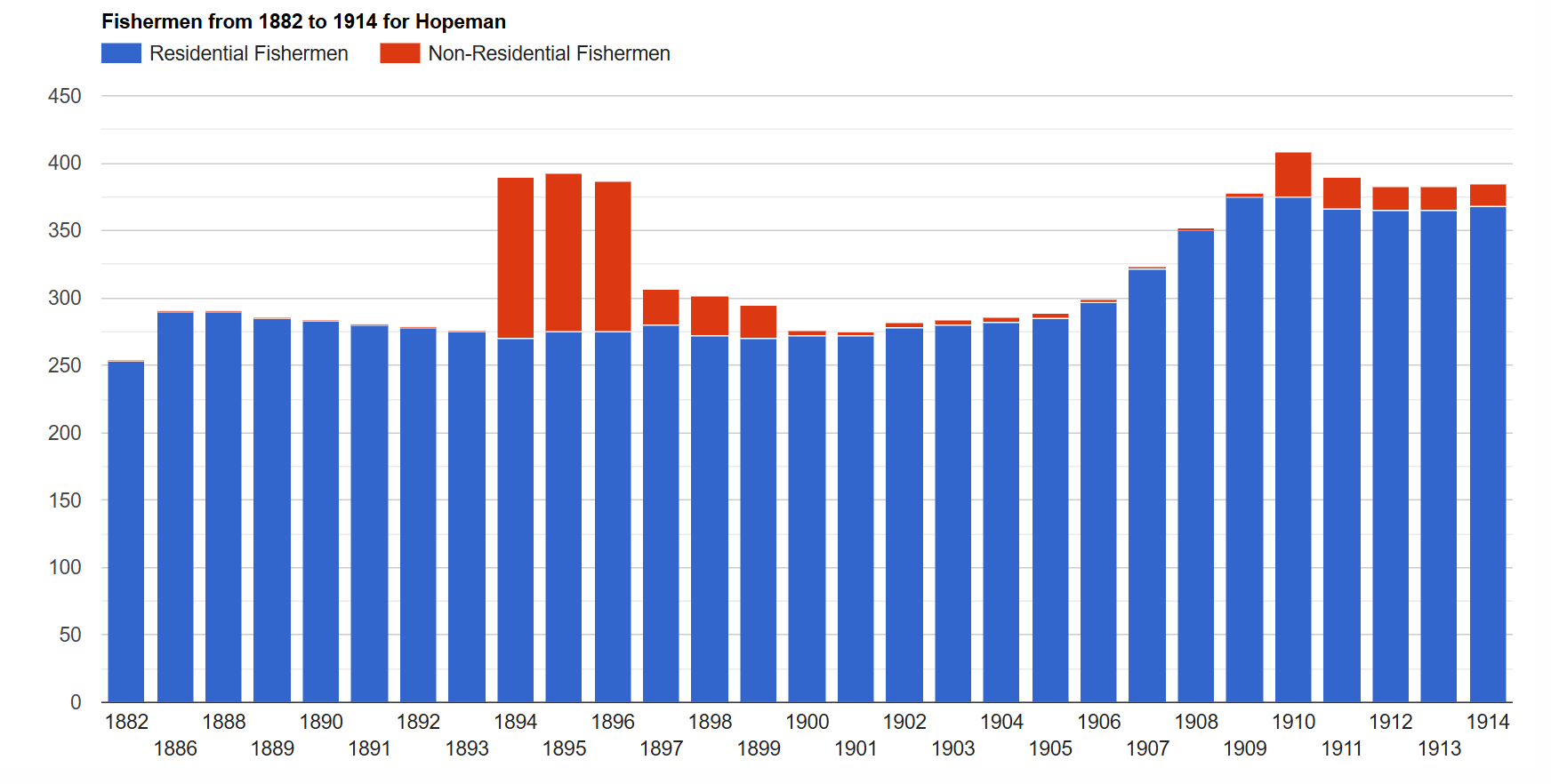
Fishermen

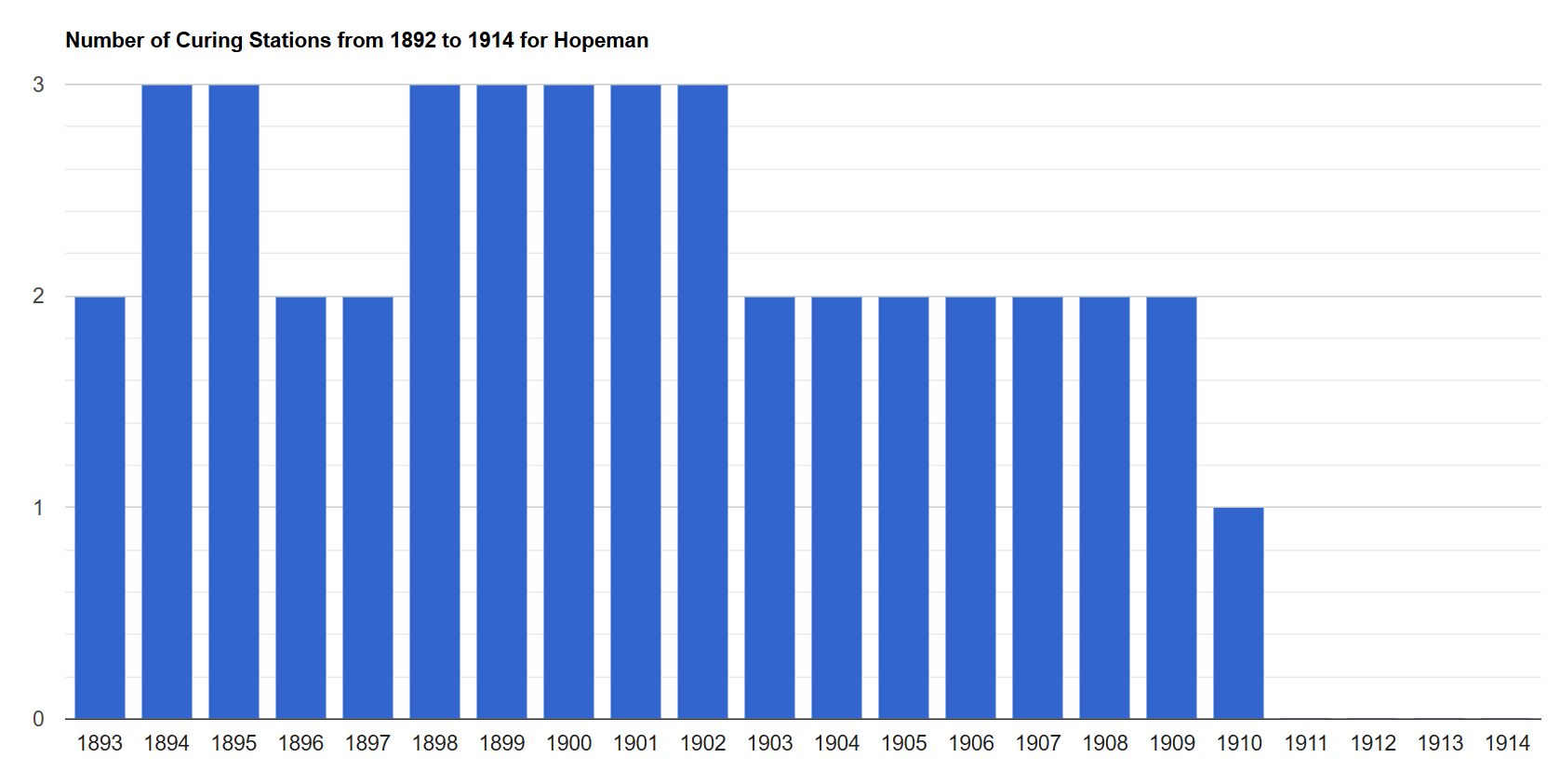
Number of curing stations

== Education ==
Hopeman Primary School is on the East side of the village and has around 250 pupils. The catchment area includes Hopeman and the nearby villages of Duffus and Cummingston. There are nine classes in the school. It is split into three houses, Duff, Cameron and Gordon, for an inter-house competition in summer. At lunch time, primary 4 to primary 7 kids get a chance to go down to sea park at their lunch break.

Gordonstoun School is but a few miles away and provides an all-round education based upon the principles of its founder Kurt Hahn.

== Places of worship ==
The Hopeman Kirk was built and dedicated around 1857. Originally a daughter church of Burghead Free Church of Scotland, it became part of the United Free Church of Scotland in 1901 and then, by the union of 1929, rejoined the Church of Scotland. In 1979 the Hopeman Kirk became formally linked with the Duffus Kirk and the Spynie Kirk, and together they form one church in three locations.

Before starting Hopeman Baptist Church in 1898, the founding members walked to Lossiemouth Baptist Church every Sunday for worship. After several years the people from Hopeman formed a local congregation, erecting a building and establishing themselves in the village. Hopeman Baptist Church is affiliated with the Baptist Union of Scotland, and they meet regularly for worship, prayer, and Bible study.

== Sport ==
Hopeman is home to Hopeman Golf Club, which was founded in 1909 and has been named in Sky Sports top 18 Scottish holes. Hopeman is also home of Hopeman FC, who are a welfare team that play in the Moray District Welfare League Premier Division. There is also a youth team called Hopeman Dynamos that train young kids aged 5 to 12, some of which have gone on to play for Junior teams like Burghead Thistle or for Lossiemouth FC and other Highland League youth teams as well as Elgin City and Inverness Caledonian Thistle youth teams. One of the first football clubs in Hopeman was Hopeman Rangers.
