= County of Moray =

Moray
- Historic county
- Morayshire shown within Scotland

- Flag of Morayshire, registered in 2023
- Interactive map of Moray
- Coordinates: 57.3°N 3.3°W
- Country: Scotland
- County town: Elgin

Area
  - Total: 476 sq mi (1,233 km^{2})
- Ranked 17th of 34
- Chapman code: MOR
- Website: www.lordlieutenantmoray.co.uk

The County of Moray, (Scottish Gaelic: Moireibh [ˈmɤɾʲəv]) or Morayshire, called Elginshire until 1919, is a historic county in Scotland. The county town was Elgin. The historic county ceased to be used for local government purposes in 1975. Since 1996 most of the historic county's area has been included in the Moray council area. The historic county boundaries are still used for certain functions, being a registration county. There is also a Moray lieutenancy area, covering a slightly smaller area than the historic county. The historic county borders Nairnshire to the west, Inverness-shire to the south, and Banffshire to the east, and has a coast onto the Moray Firth to the north.

== History ==
Moray was a province in the Middle Ages, covering a much larger area than the later county. It lay to the north of the Kingdom of Alba (early Scotland), sometimes functioning as a vassal of the Scottish crown, and at other times operating as a separate kingdom. Moray was finally absorbed into the Kingdom of Scotland during the 12th century.

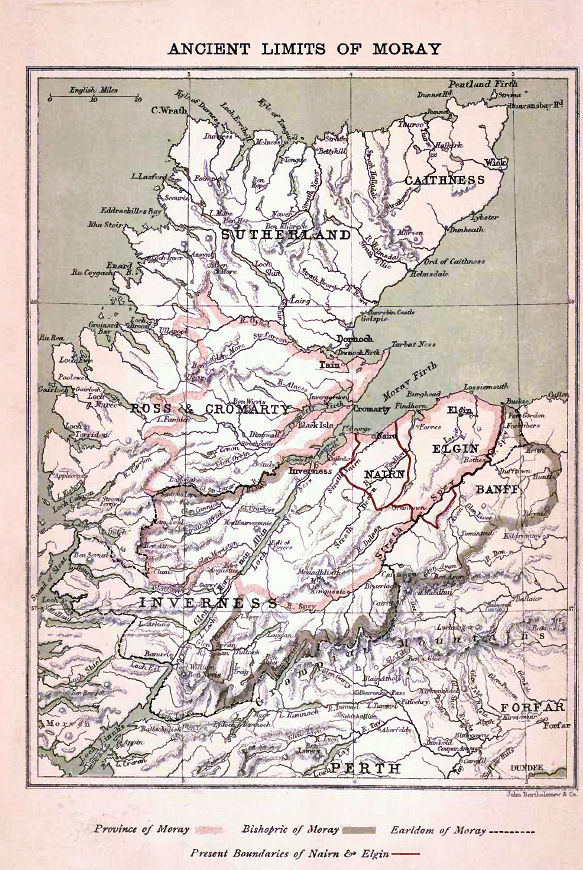
Map showing the medieval province, diocese, and earldom of Moray, which each had different definitions (and were subject to occasional changes).

In order to secure the Scottish crown's authority over the area, it was divided into shires, being areas administered by a sheriff. The old earldom of Moray was broadly split into the three shires of Elginshire, Nairnshire, and the mainland parts of Inverness-shire.

There is some evidence that these shires were established under David I (reigned 1124–1153), but the earliest documented Sheriff of Elgin was in the 13th century. There was also a short-lived shire centred on Forres, which in the early 14th century was grouped with Nairn, before later being united instead with Elgin. The shire of Elgin was therefore sometimes called the shire of 'Elgin and Forres'.

The shire of Elgin, or Elginshire, was seen as the core of the old territory of Moray and so was informally sometimes called Moray or Morayshire. 'Murrayshire' and 'Morrowshire' were sometimes used historically as alternate spellings.

Over time, Scotland's shires became more significant than the old provinces, with more administrative functions being given to the sheriffs. In 1667 Commissioners of Supply were established for each shire, which would serve as the main administrative body for the area until the creation of county councils in 1890. Following the Acts of Union in 1707, the English term 'county' came to be used interchangeably with the older term 'shire'.

The population of Elginshire in 1841 was 35,012.

There were occasional adjustments to county boundaries. For example, in 1870, an exclave of Inverness-shire (surrounded by Nairnshire, Elginshire and Banffshire), including Cromdale and Grantown-on-Spey, was transferred to Elginshire, while the Elginshire's southern exclave around Abernethy and Duthil went to Inverness-shire.

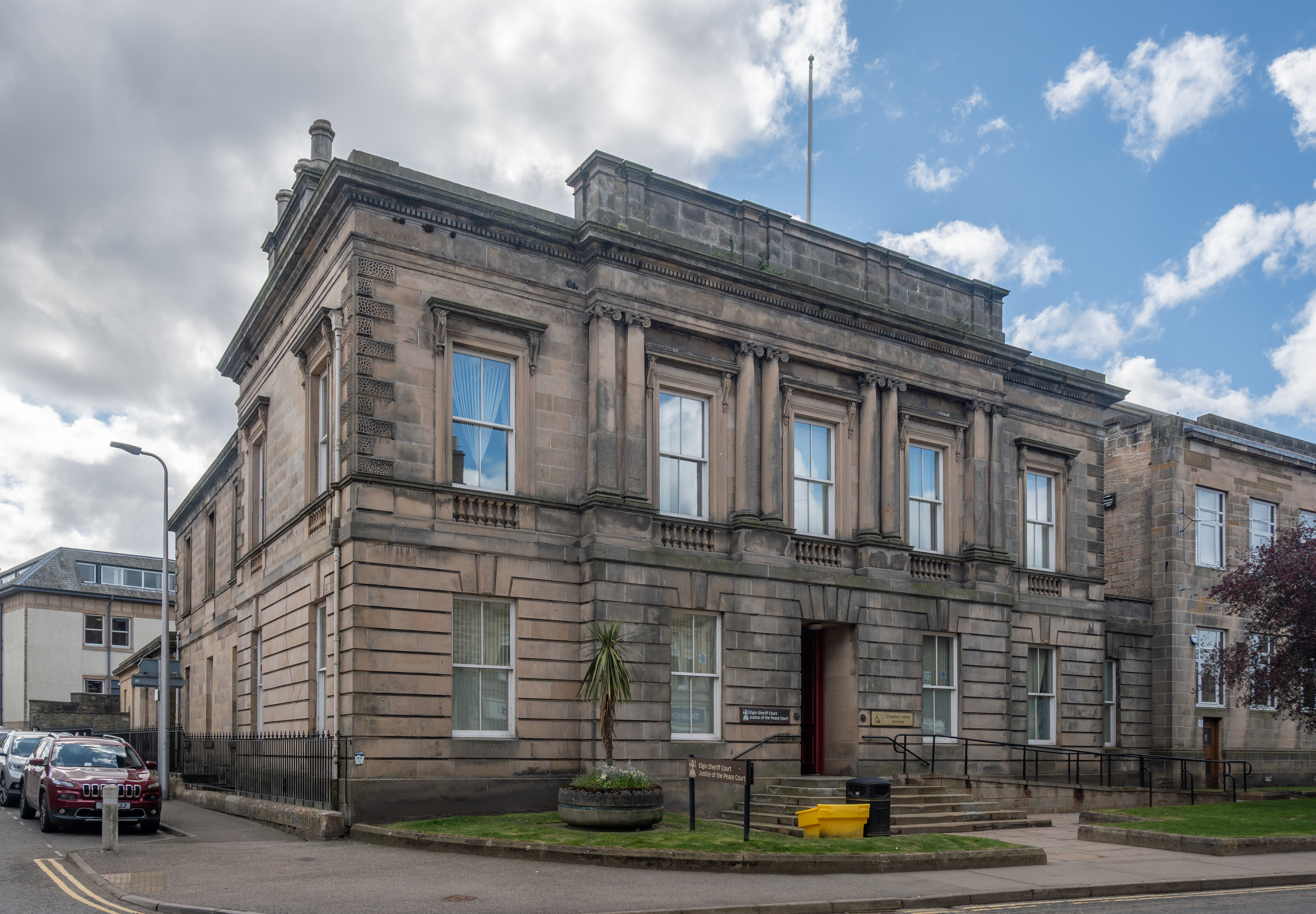
Elgin Sheriff Court: The county's main courthouse, built 1866.

Elected county councils were established in 1890 under the Local Government (Scotland) Act 1889, taking most of the functions of the commissioners (which were eventually abolished in 1930). The burgh of Elgin was deemed capable of providing its own county-level local government functions, and so it was excluded from the administrative area of the county council, although the county council still chose to base itself there. Elginshire County Council held its first meeting on 22 May 1890 at the Old Courthouse (built 1837) which adjoined Elgin Sheriff Court. The Old Courthouse also served as the meeting place for the commissioners.

The 1889 Act also led to a review of boundaries, with exclaves being transferred to a county they actually bordered, and parish and county boundaries being adjusted to eliminate cases where parishes straddled county boundaries. There were several such changes affecting the boundaries of Elginshire, notably absorbing three detached parts of Nairnshire which were surrounded by Elginshire.

At a meeting on 7 May 1919, Elginshire County Council voted to change the name of the county from the County of Elgin or Elginshire to Moray. The government responded by directing all departments to use Moray, but noted that the legal name would remain Elgin until such time as it could be changed by statute. The statutory change of name from Elgin to Moray eventually took place in 1947 under the Local Government (Scotland) Act 1947.

Reforms in 1930 under the Local Government (Scotland) Act 1929 saw the burgh of Elgin brought within the administrative area of the county council, and merged the county councils of Moray and neighbouring Nairnshire for most purposes. The two county councils continued to be elected as separate bodies, but operated together as the "Joint County Council of Moray and Nairn", serving the combined area of the two counties.

Moray County Council was initially based at the Old Courthouse adjoining Elgin Sheriff Court on the High Street in Elgin. By the 1930s it was too small and so was demolished and replaced by a new headquarters on the same site, called the 'County Buildings'. Work began on the new building in 1938 but was paused due to the Second World War. The new building was eventually completed in 1952.

In 1975 the Local Government (Scotland) Act 1973 reorganised local government in Scotland into a two-tier system of regions and districts. The burgh of Grantown-on-Spey and district of Cromdale which surrounded it (which area had been in Inverness-shire prior to 1870), was included in the Badenoch and Strathspey district of the Highland region. The rest of the pre-1975 county of Moray was included in a new district called Moray in the Grampian region, which also took in significant territory from the western part of Banffshire.

In 1996 the Scottish local government system was reorganised again, this time into single-tier council areas. The Moray district became one of the new council areas. The boundaries of the pre-1975 county of Moray are still used for some limited official purposes connected with land registration, being a registration county. The pre-1975 county of Moray excluding Cromdale and Grantown-on-Spey also serves as a lieutenancy area.

== Coat of arms ==
Granted in 1927 by the Lord Lyon, Moray County Council's coat-of-arms was: Quarterly: 1st and 4th Azure, three mullets argent; 2nd and 3rd Argent, three cushions gules within a tressure flory-counter-flory of the last. The motto was SUB SPE, Latin for "In Hope", a pun on the River Spey, which flows through the county. The coat of arms, described by Thomas Innes of Learney, a future Lord Lyon, in the Elgin Courant of 6 May 1927 as "the most beautiful county arms in Scotland", represented the clan Murray and Randolph, Earl of Moray, the two main landowners.

== Geography ==
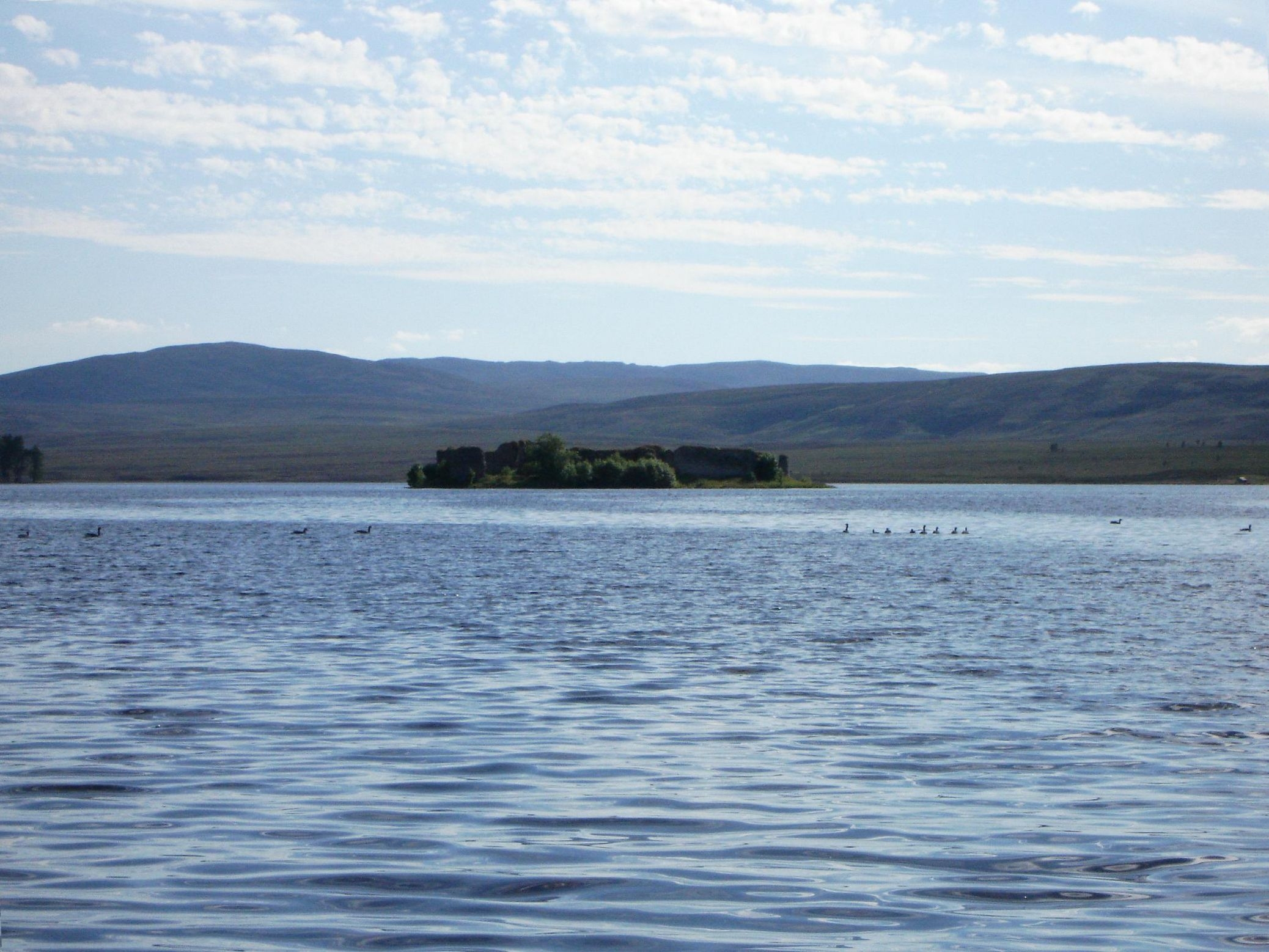
Lochindorb in southern Moray

Moray consists of a flattish coastal section, containing the main towns, with a hilly interior, extending into the Grampian Mountains in the far south. Notable features of the coast are Findhorn Bay and the broad arc of Burghead Bay. The coast around Lossiemouth is somewhat rockier, and includes the small islands of Covesea Skerries and Halliman Skerries offshore.

There are several lochs in the county, none of which are particularly large. They include Loch Dallas, Loch Noir, the Lochs of Little Benshalag, Loch of the Cowlatt, Lochanan a' Ghiubhais, Loch an Salich, Loch Trevie, Loch Tutach, Loch Allan, Loch Stuart, Loch Mhic Leòid, Loch Ille Mhòr, Lochan Dubh, Loch nan Stuirteag, Loch an t-Sithein and Lochindorb.

== Settlements ==
Prior to 1975, there were six burghs in the county. Burghs were abolished as part of the 1975 local government reforms. The burghs were:

- Burghead
- Elgin
- Forres
- Grantown-on-Spey
- Lossiemouth and Branderburgh
- Rothes

Other settlements include:

- Alves
- Archiestown
- Cromdale
- Cummingston
- Dallas
- Duffus
- Dyke
- Findhorn
- Fochabers
- Fogwatt
- Garmouth
- Hopeman
- Kellas
- Kingston on Spey
- Kinloss
- Kintessack
- Lhanbryde
- Longmorn
- Mosstodloch
- Rafford
- Urquhart
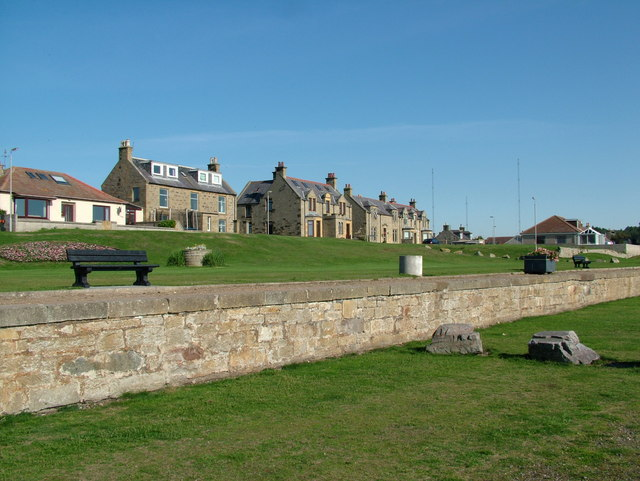
Burghead

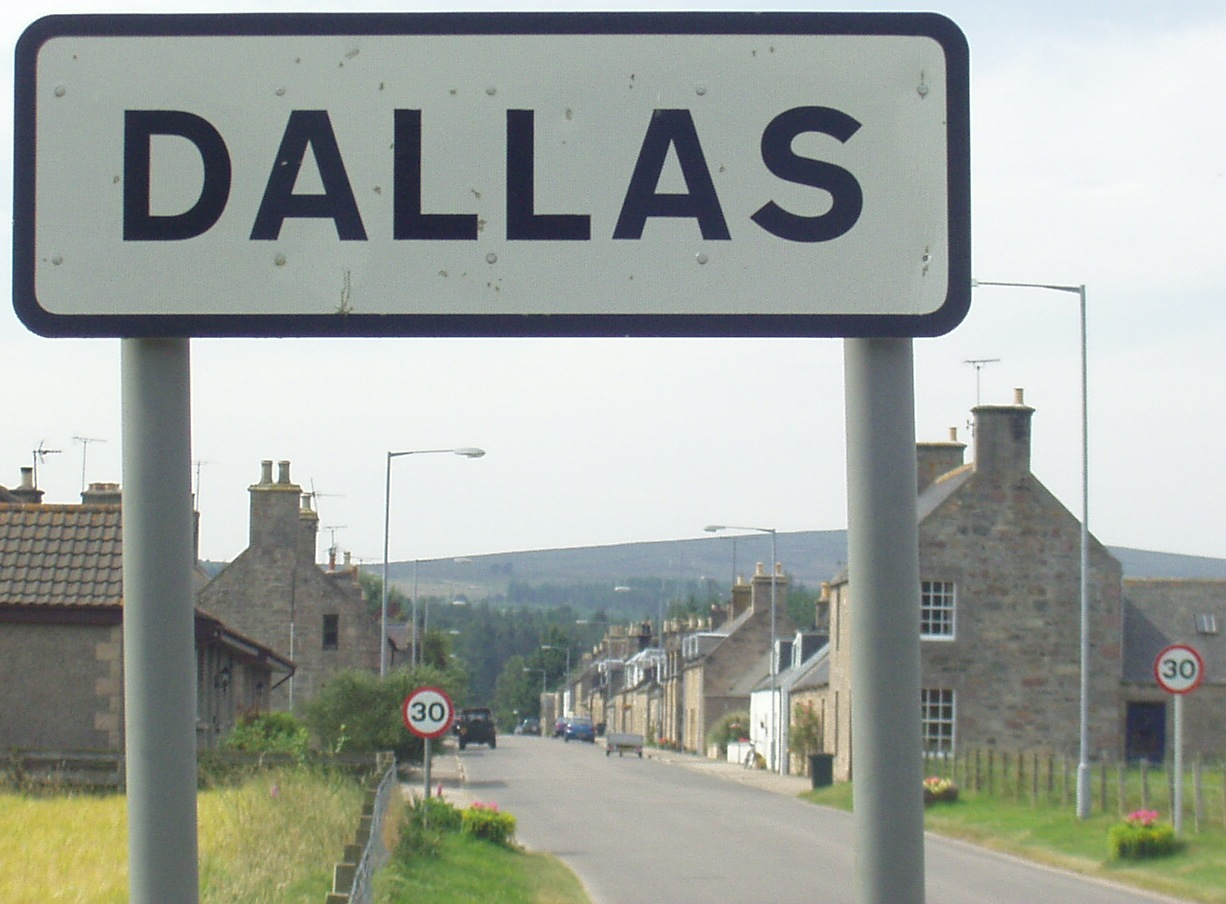
Dallas

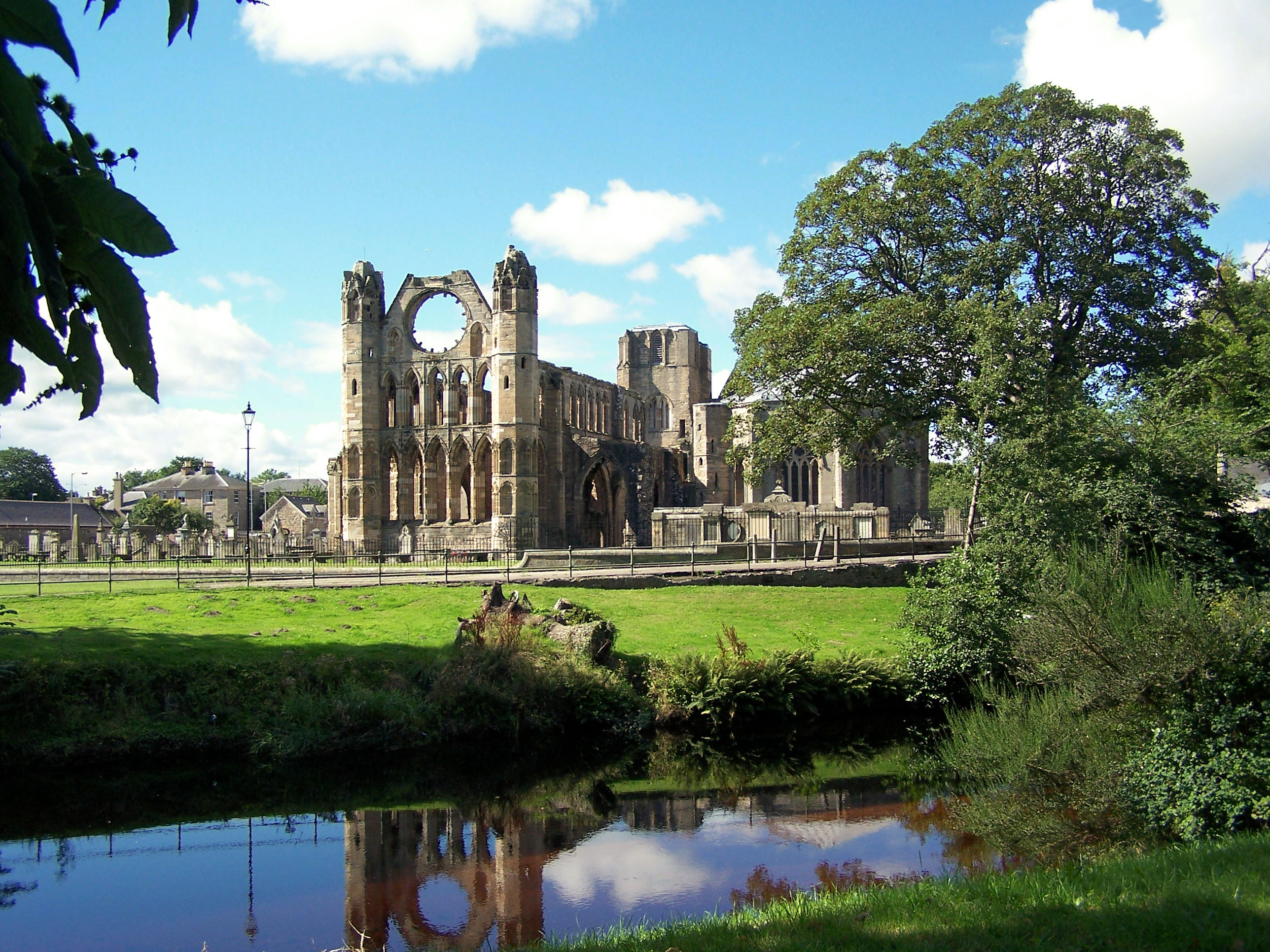
Elgin

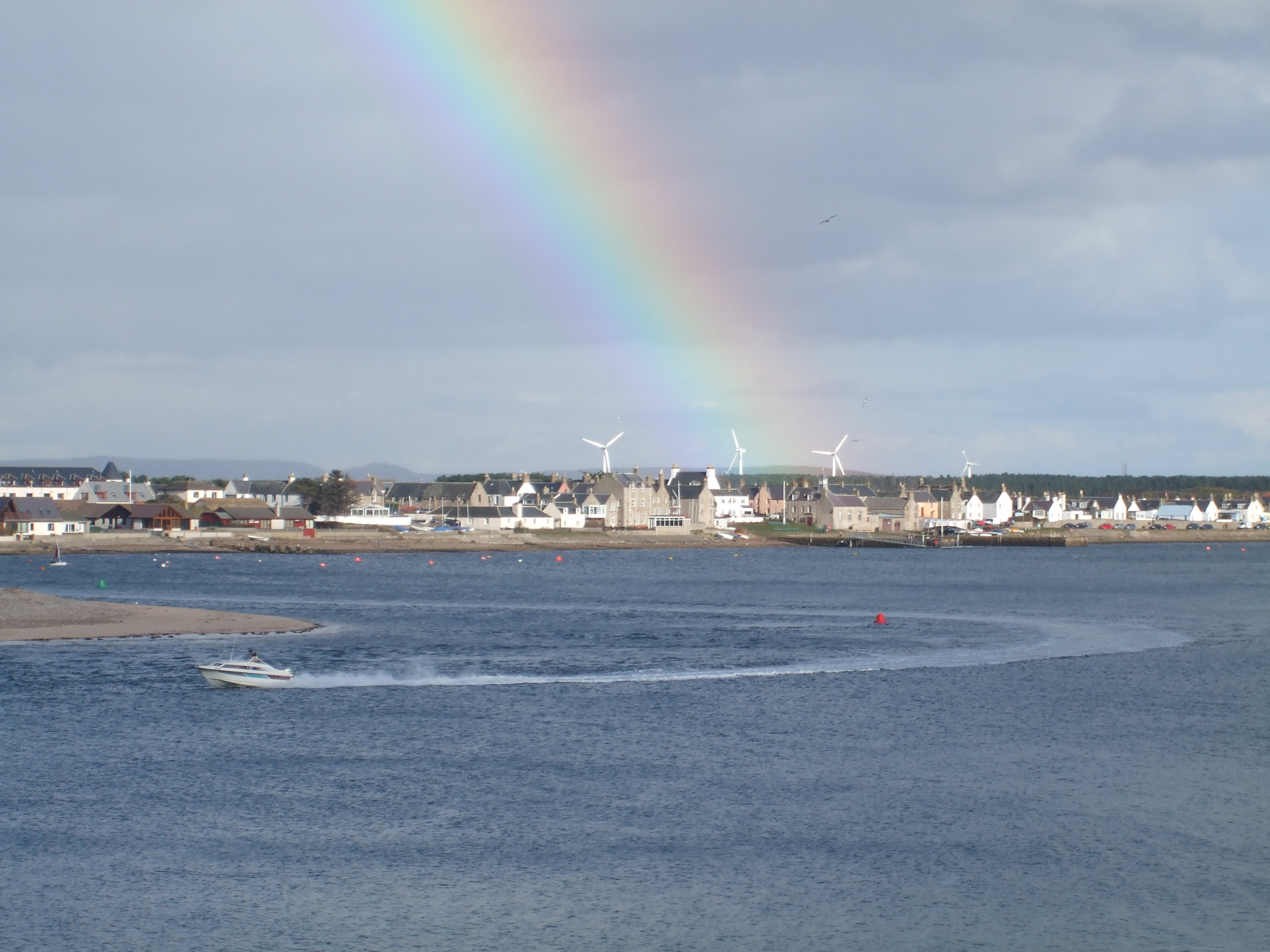
Findhorn

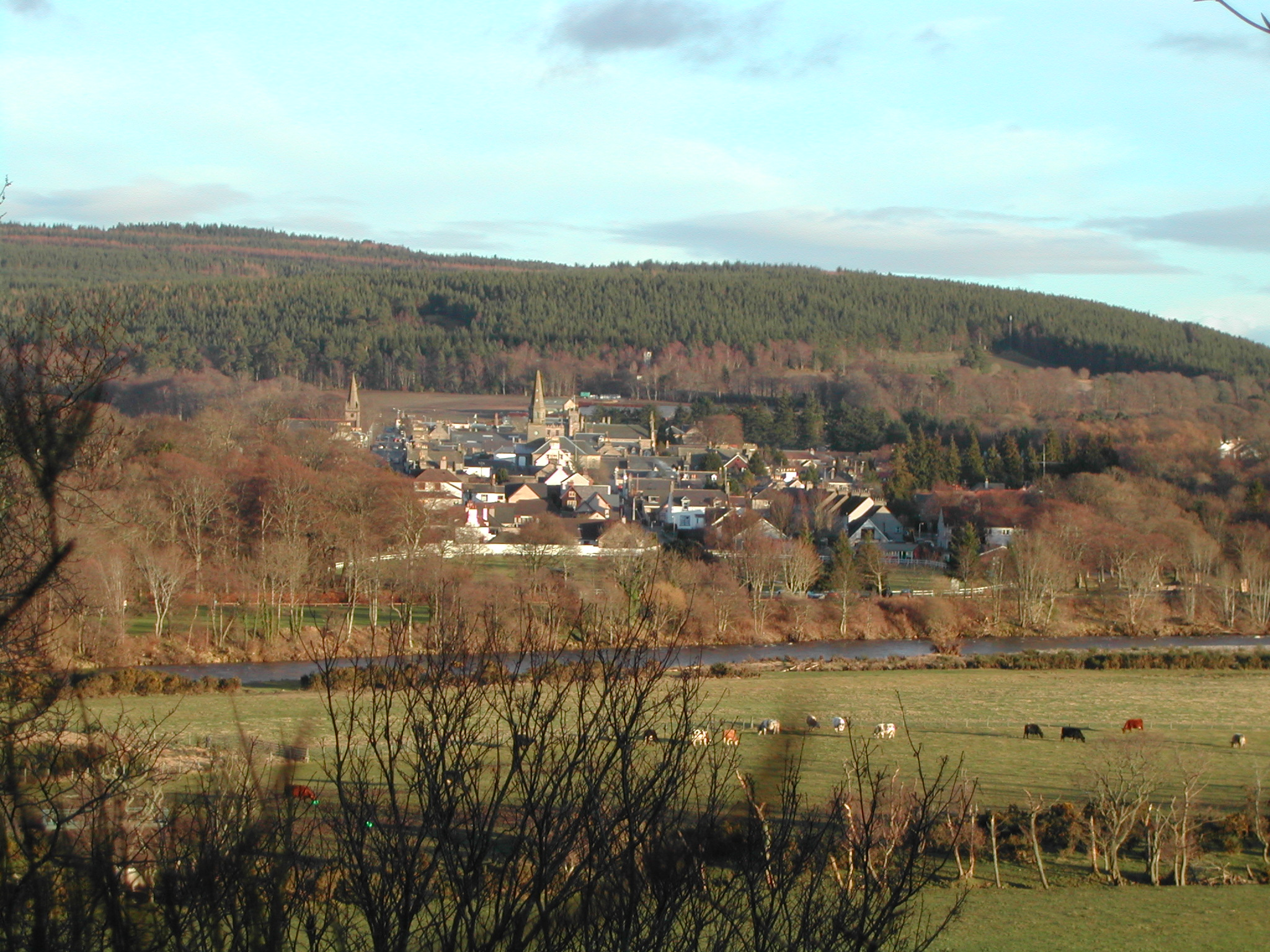
Fochabers

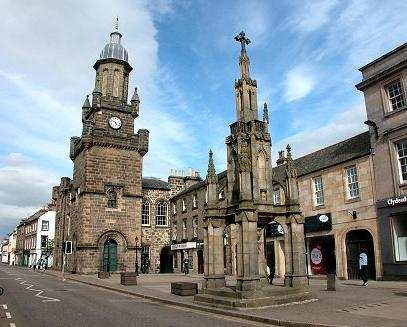
Forres

== Civil parishes ==
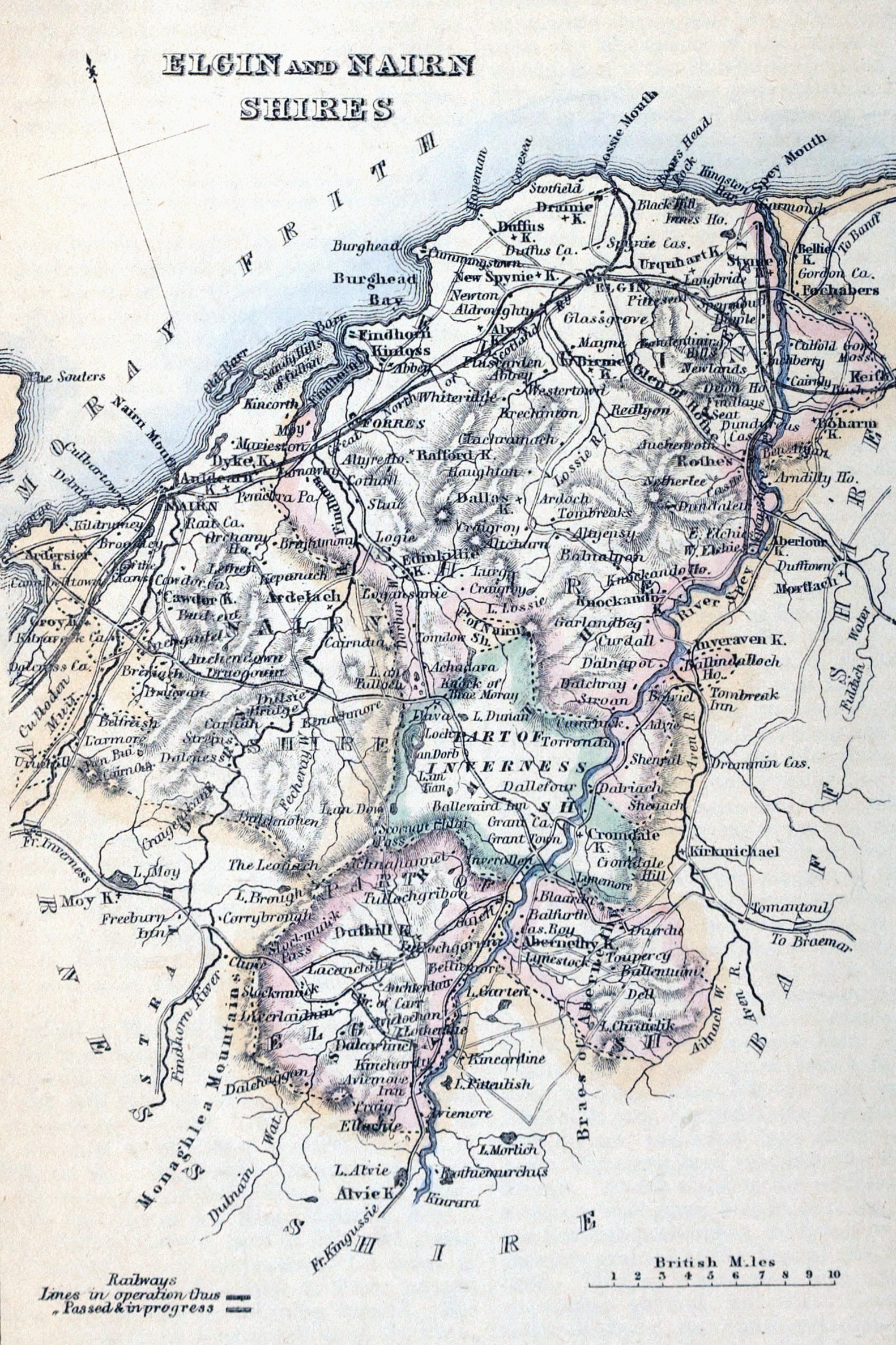
Morayshire (Elginshire) & Nairnshire Civil Parish map. c.1861

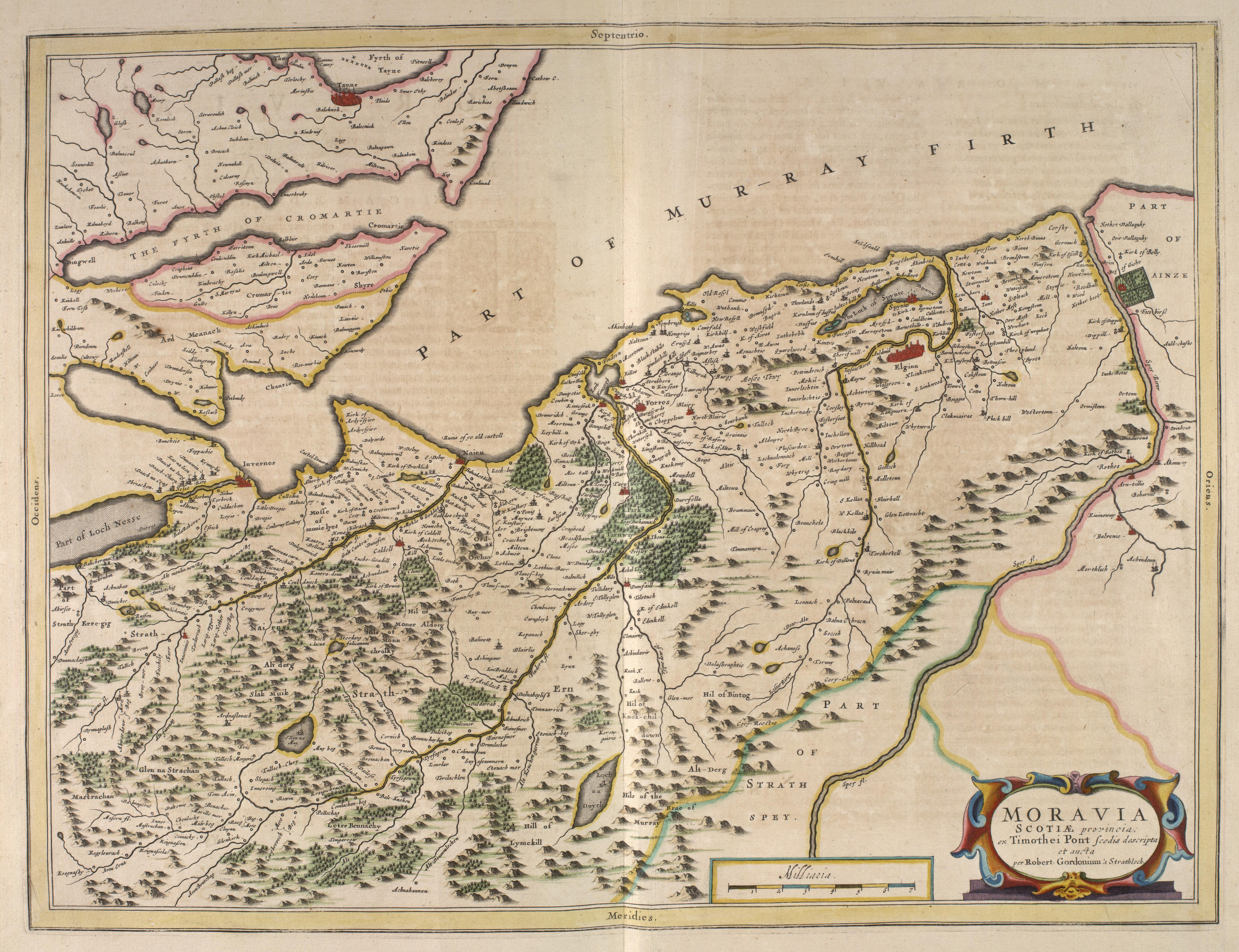
Moravia in Blaeu's 1654 Atlas of Scotland

Civil parishes are still used for some statistical purposes, and separate census figures are published for them. As their areas have been largely unchanged since the 19th century this allows for comparison of population figures over an extended period of time. From 1845 to 1930, parishes formed part of the local government system of Scotland, having parochial boards from 1845 to 1894.

In 1861 there were 15 civil parishes entirely in Moray:

1. Alves
2. Birnie
3. Dallas
4. Drainie
5. Duffus
6. Edinkillie (see List of listed buildings in Edinkillie, Moray)
7. Elgin
8. Forres
9. Kinloss
10. Knockando
11. Lhanbryde
12. Rafford
13. Speymouth
14. Spynie
15. Urquhart

In 1861 Morayshire shared various civil parishes with three surrounding counties. Five with Banffshire:

1. Bellie Fochabers
2. Boharm
3. Inveraven
4. Keith
5. Rothes

three with Inverness-shire:

1. Abernethy
2. Cromdale
3. Duthill

and one with Nairnshire:

1. Dyke

== Flag ==
In 2023, the Lord Lieutenant of Moray organised a competition to design a flag for the lieutenancy area. The winning design is green, gold and blue, representing the area's agriculture and links to the sea.

== See also ==
- List of counties of Scotland 1890–1975
- List of civil parishes in Scotland
