= Thomas Munro (solicitor) =

Scottish solicitor, county council clerk and public servant

Sir Thomas Munro GBE
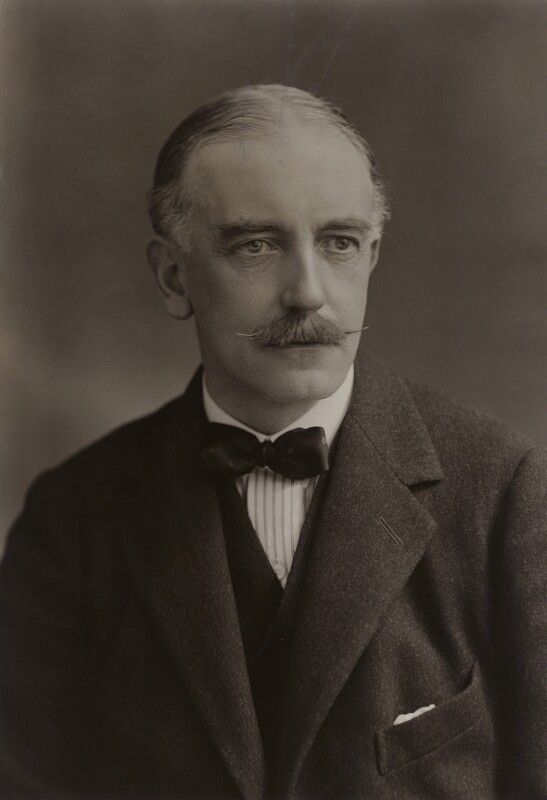
- Munro in 1917

Clerk to Lanarkshire County Council
- In office February 1919 – 11 April 1923

Chief Labour Adviser to the Ministry of Munitions
- In office August 1917 – February 1919

Clerk to Lanarkshire County Council
- In office ? – August 1917

Personal details
- Born: 10 June 1866 Tain, Ross-shire, Scotland
- Died: 11 April 1923 (aged 56)
- Occupation: Solicitor

Sir Thomas Munro (10 June 1866 – 11 April 1923) was a Scottish solicitor, county council clerk and public servant.

Munro was born in Tain, Ross-shire, the son of a solicitor. He was educated at Milne's Institution, Fochabers, and the University of Edinburgh, and then qualified as a solicitor himself. He later became clerk to Lanarkshire County Council.

He served as one of the Commissioners on the Dilution of Labour on the Clyde, and in consequence was in August 1917 appointed Chief Labour Adviser to the Ministry of Munitions. In February 1919, although asked to stay, he resigned from government service and returned to Lanarkshire County Council, where he remained until his death.

Munro was knighted in 1914 for his services to Lanarkshire. For his wartime services he was appointed Knight Commander of the Order of the British Empire (KBE) in 1917 and Knight Grand Cross of the Order of the British Empire (GBE) in the 1920 civilian war honours.
