= Flag of Moray =

Historic Scottish county flag

Moray
- Proportion: 3:5
- Adopted: 28 October 2023
- Designed by: Aila Gibson

The Moray flag is the flag of the Scottish county of Moray, registered with the Flag Institute on 28 October 2023.

== History ==
On 24 January 2023 the Moray Lieutenancy announced a competition designed to secure a flag for the county. The competition launched on 27 February and ran for four weeks, alongside a similar competition in neighbouring Banffshire, with both closing on 24 March. The competition’s 626 submissions were shortlisted to four finalists by a judging panel at the end of April, for inclusion in a public vote starting 27 June and closing on 8 August. The winning design's creator, Aila Gibson of Dallas Primary School, raised the flag at an official launch ceremony on 28 October at Elgin Town Hall. The flag was raised simultaneously at Forres, Lossiemouth and Fochabers.

== Design ==
The Pantone colours for the flag are:

- Green 356
- Dark Green 357
- Gold 130
- Blue 280

== Contenders ==
Design A

The winning design.

Design B

The central symbol is a cupola, visible atop whisky distilleries throughout Morayshire (which falls within the wider Strathspey region, known for its whisky production). The zigzag pattern references the hills surrounding the inland borders of the county. The blue stripe stands for the sky and sea, while the reddish-purple stripe is for the heather of the hills. The gold stripe symbolises Morayshire's rich agriculture, and also serves as a further homage to the county's whisky industry.

Design C

The salmon stands for both Morayshire's inland waterways and the sea off its coast, as well as the county's prominent maritime fishing industry. Additionally, the salmon was revered by the Picts for its wisdom, and thus its inclusion on the flag can also serve as a symbol for the abundance of ancient sites located throughout Morayshire.

Design D

The three white stars have been long associated with the Earldom of Moray (and also feature on the current arms of Moray Council). The blue is a homage to the county's heraldic traditions, albeit in a darker shade for Morayshire's dark skies. The orange stands for the whisky production of the area, with the wavy line referencing the River Spey, after which the Strathspey region is named.
