= John M. Caie =

Scottish civil servant and poet

John Morrison Caie CB FRSE LLD (20 August 1878 – 22 December 1949) was a Scottish civil servant and poet. His poetry centres upon rural life in north-east Scotland.

== Life ==
Caie was born in Banchory and raised in Fochabers, Moray. He was the son of the Rev William S. Caie, minister of Enzie parish church, in Banffshire, and Helen Smith Scott.

He was educated at Milne's Institute in Fochabers and graduated from the University of Aberdeen (MA, BL, BSc). A lawyer and agronomist, Caie became a civil servant at the Board of Agriculture for Scotland in 1912. He rose to the level of Deputy Secretary from 1939 to 1945 (during the critical period of World War II).

In 1940, he was elected a Fellow of the Royal Society of Edinburgh, with James Couper Brash among his proposers.

He was a noted poet, writing on subjects drawn from the rural culture of northeast Scotland. He is best known nowadays for his humorous poem, The Puddock, one of many that he wrote in his native Doric dialect. The poem remains a favourite piece for teaching in Scottish primary schools.

In 1945, Aberdeen University awarded him an honorary doctorate (LLD).

He died in Aberdeen on 22 December 1949.

== Family ==
He married Mary Macleod in 1908.

== Selected bibliography ==
- The Kindly North: verse in Scots and English (Aberdeen: D. Wyllie & Son, 1934)
- Twixt Hills and Sea: verse in Scots and English (Aberdeen: D. Wyllie & Son, 1939)
