= Franz Mayer of Munich =

German stained glass company

Coordinates: 48.1466°N 11.5583°E

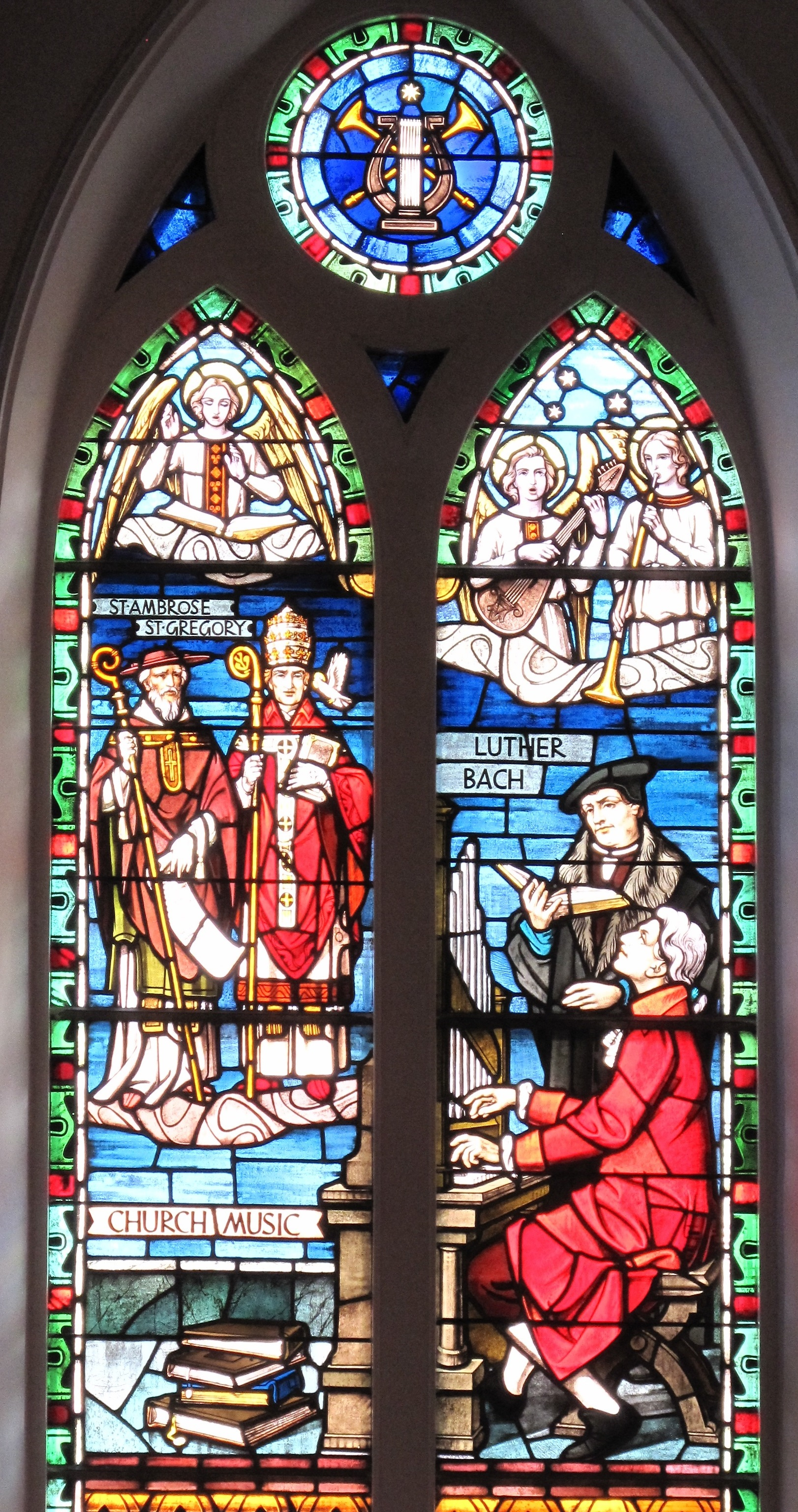
Window by Franz Mayer & Co. for St. Matthew's German Evangelical Lutheran Church in Charleston, South Carolina, USA

Franz Mayer of Munich (in German - Mayer’sche Hofkunstanstalt) is a German stained glass design and manufacturing company, based in Munich, Germany and a major exponent of the Munich style of stained glass, that has been active throughout most of the world for over 170 years. The firm was popular during the late nineteenth and early twentieth century, and was the principal provider of stained glass to the large Catholic churches that were constructed throughout the world during that period. Franz Mayer of Munich were stained glass artists to the Holy See and consequently were popular with Catholic clients. The family business is nowadays managed by the fifth generation and works in conjunction with artists around the world.

== History ==
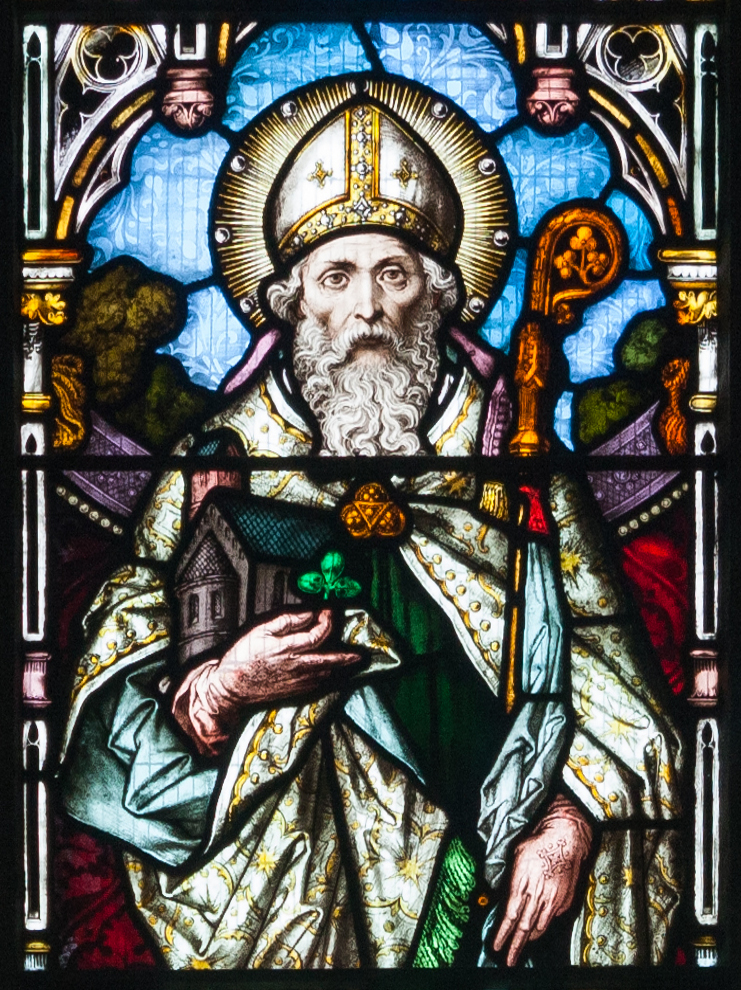
Saint Patrick, Monaghan Cathedral

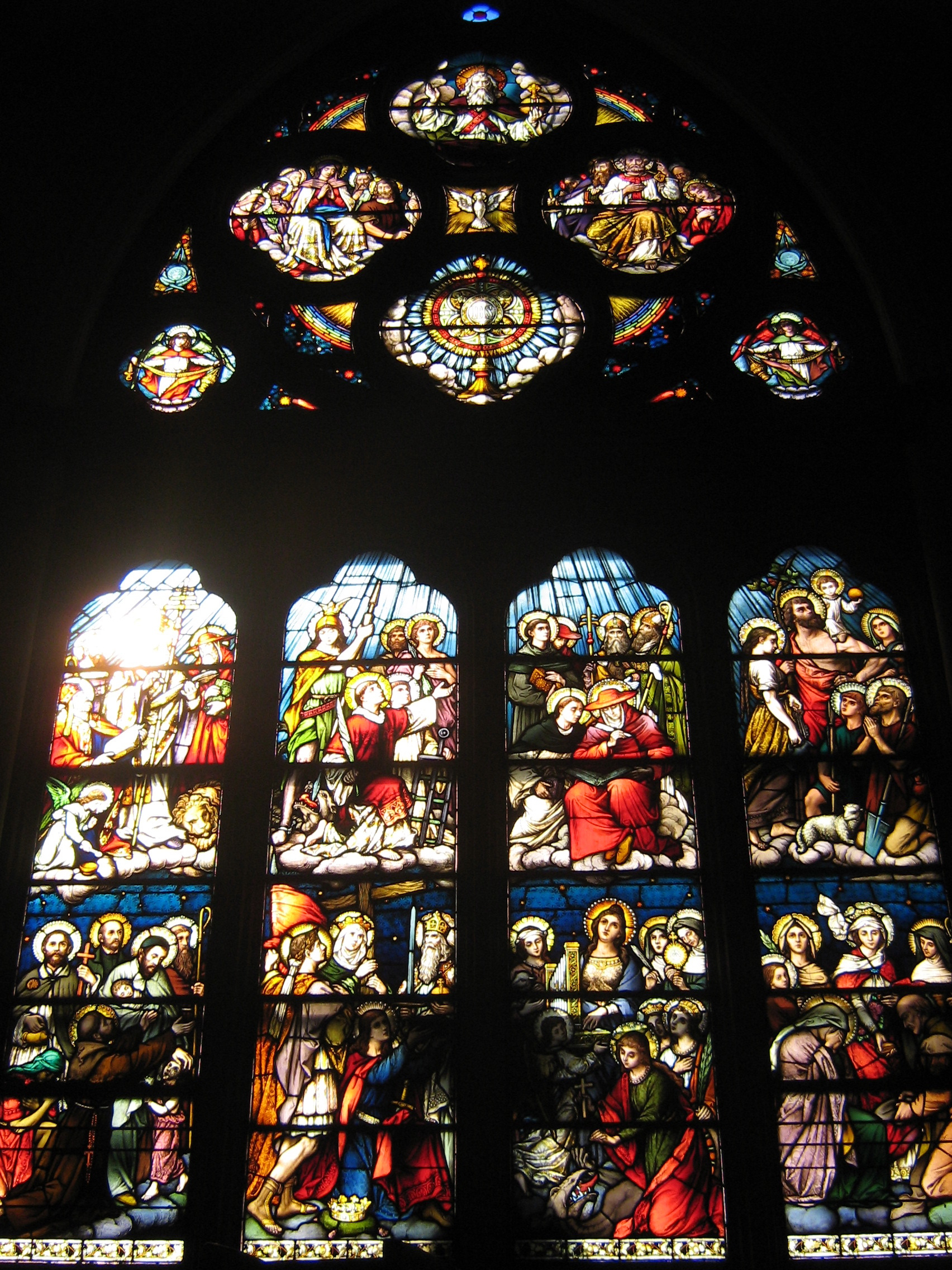
Great window in the choir gallery of St. Mary – St. Catherine of Siena Parish (Charlestown, MA, USA)

=== Founder – Joseph Gabriel Mayer ===
In 1847, Joseph Gabriel Mayer (1808–1883) founded the Institute for Christian Art in Munich, to make ecclesiastical furnishings. Royal commissions for the Cologne and Regensburg cathedrals drew Mayer to create a stained glass department in 1860. In 1865, a branch was opened in London, and in 1888 in New York City.

"Stylistically, Mayer's windows tend to contain richly colored scenes bordered by architectural frames consisting of pilasters, columns, architrave and elaborate canopies." It represents an aesthetic that was evidently prized in its time for its craftsmanship and opulence as well as for its ability to engage the viewer emotionally and spiritually.

Broadly speaking, the Munich Pictorial Style is Romantic and "owed much to the revival of religious painting – especially fresco painting in the tradition of the Italian Renaissance masters, especially Masaccio, Raphael, and Michelangelo – in Germany early in the 19th-century." "The studio often incorporated imagery from Great Master paintings as well as compositions of the nineteenth century, a standard practice in public decorative work of the era. For example, a window in the Cathedral of St. John the Baptist, Charleston, South Carolina, installed in 1907 or 1925–26, shows the Transfiguration of Christ modeled after the 1517 painting by Raphael in the Vatican."

=== 2nd Generation ===
- Joseph Leonhard Mayer (1846–1898), sculptor and artistic director
- Franz Borghias Mayer (1848–1926), artist and councilor of commerce

In 1882, the company was awarded the status of “Royal Bavarian Art Establishment“ by King Ludwig the II. In 1892, Pope Leo XIII named the company a “Pontifical Institute of Christian Art“. "Munich glass windows could be imported as art, i.e., glass “paintings” and—exempt from a high tariff on imported “raw” glass ... the broad aesthetic appeal, economic advantage, and papal approval made Munich glass windows the overwhelming choice among Catholics in the United States."

=== 3rd Generation – between two wars ===
- Anton Mayer (1886–1967), academic painter
- Karl Mayer (1889–1971), poet and merchant
- Adalbert Mayer (1894–1987), businessman and strategist

In 1919, the company became a workshop for free artists such as Karl Knappe. In 1922 the neighboring properties on Seidlstraße 25/27 were purchased. The new building by the architect Theodor Fischer serves as today's company headquarters. In the years following 1933, the Mayer brothers successfully remain untangled with the affairs of the NSDAP. In 1939 the companies Mayer and Zettler combined, but production ground to a halt in 1941. In 1944, the staff had decreased from an original 500 to fewer than 20 employees.

Rapid renovations followed the war. Many of Munich's cathedral windows were restored by the company, such as the windows of the Munich Frauenkirche. In 1961, Karl Knappe designed a mosaic for the Assumption of Mary Cathedral, Hiroshima.

=== 4th Generation – transition to international artist workshop ===
- Konrad Mayer (1923–2012), son of Karl Mayer
- Gabriel Mayer (born 1938), son of Adalbert Mayer

In 1953, Konrad Mayer took over the representation in South America. From 1970 on, Gabriel Mayer pushed architecture-related works and the Middle East market, resulting in the realization of the Heart Tent by Bettina and Frei Otto at the Diplomatic Club Riyadh, Saudi Arabia. In 1988, Gabriel Mayer founded a new workshop in New York with the focus on public art. From the 1990s, many projects with artist Brian Clarke were realized, in Rio de Janeiro, New York and more.

In 2013, Gabriel Mayer pulled back from the company's management board. In 2016 he was awarded the Bavarian Culture Prize together with Charlotte Knobloch.

=== 5th Generation – present ===
- Michael Claudius Mayer (born 1967), mosaicist and businessman
- Petra Wilma Mayer (born 1964), Architect (TUM)

Since 1994, the couple collaborated on Munich projects such as the Herz-Jesu-Kirche (1996), Fünf Höfe (2001) and Path of memory, Ohel Jakob synagogue (2005). Around the turn of the millennium, Gabriel and Michael Mayer revived the traditional stained-glass Munich/Mayer Style and thus the DNA of the house. The float glass department was newly constructed. In 2014 the company opened an office at New York City. In 2018, Petra Mayer founded the Chamber of Wonders, featuring editions and selected pieces from a selection of worldwide artist friends. In the same year, Franz Mayer of Munich realized a 400m2 mosaic for the New York City metro station World Trade Center station (PATH) with the artist Ann Hamilton.

Mayer's commissions include over seventy-six cathedrals, twenty-six of them in the United States.

Along with the stained glass, about half of the company's work is in mosaics. In the fifties and sixties, Mayer developed their own fiberglass mesh. Adhesives have also been developed to the firm's own specifications. The company provides installation and curatorial services.

Today, the company fabricates and realizes mosaic and glass projects in collaboration with renowned artists, such as Georg Baselitz, Kiki Smith, Shahzia Sikander, Brian Clarke, Doug and Mike Starn, Ellsworth Kelly, Jani Leinonen, JR, William Wegman, Nick Cave, Sean Scully, Jan Hendrix, Peter Beard or Vik Muniz.

== List of Works ==
=== Australia ===
- Church of St. John the Evangelist, Fremantle, Western Australia
- St Patrick's Cathedral, Chapel of the Blessed Sacrament, [Melbourne], [Victoria]

=== Canada ===
- Cathedral of the Immaculate Conception, Saint John, New Brunswick
- St John's (Stone) Church, Saint John, New Brunswick
- St. Patrick's Church, Halifax, Nova Scotia
- St. Luke's Anglican Church, Annapolis Royal, Nova Scotia
- Basilica of Our Lady Immaculate, Guelph, Ontario
- Cathedral of Christ the King, Hamilton, Ontario
- St. Mary's Cathedral, Kingston, Ontario
- Blessed Sacrament Catholic Church, Ottawa, Ontario
- St. Patrick's Basilica, Ottawa, Ontario
- Cathedral Church of St. James, Toronto, Ontario
- St. Michael's Church, Toronto, Ontario
- Church of St. Thomas Aquinas, Toronto, Ontario
- Basilica de Notre-Dame, Montreal, Quebec
- Cathedral-Basilica de Notre-Dame, Quebec City, Quebec
- St._Joseph's_Basilica_(Edmonton), Edmonton, Alberta

=== Chile ===
- Cathedral of Antofagasta, Antofagasta, Chile

=== England ===
- Church of St. Michael, Princetown, Devon
- St Nicholas' Church, Weymouth, Dorset
- St. Andrew's Church, Brinton, Norfolk
- St. Andrew's Church, Framingham Pigot, Norfolk
- St John's Church, Acaster Selby, North Yorkshire
- All Saints' Church, Appleton Roebuck, North Yorkshire
- All Saints' Church, Rockwell Green, Somerset
- Pershore Abbey, Pershore, Worcestershire
- St. Mary's Church, Hale, Hampshire

St Matthew's Church, Landscove. Devon

=== France ===
- Holy Trinity Church, Nice, Alpes-Maritimes

=== New Zealand ===
- All Saints' Church, Dunedin, South Island

=== Northern Ireland ===
- St. Peter's Cathedral, Belfast, County Antrim
- St. Mark's Church, Belfast, County Antrim
- Christ Church Cathedral, Lisburn, County Antrim
- St. Patrick's Cathedral, Armagh, County Armagh
- Church of Christ the Redeemer, Lurgan, County Armagh
- St. Malachy's Church, Castlewellan, County Down
- St. Patrick's Catholic Church, Downpatrick, County Down
- St. John's Church, Hilltown, County Down
- Newry Cathedral, Newry, County Down
- St. Michael's Church, Enniskillen, County Fermanagh
- St Columb's Cathedral, Derry, County Londonderry
- St Eugene's Cathedral, Derry, County Londonderry
- Church of the Assumption, Magherafelt, County Londonderry
- Church of the Sacred Heart, Omagh, County Tyrone
- Loreto Church, Omagh, County Tyrone

=== Pakistan ===
- St. Patrick's Cathedral, Karachi, Sindh

=== Republic of Ireland ===
- Cathedral of the Assumption, Carlow, County Carlow
- St. Fethlimidh's Cathedral, Kilmore, County Cavan
- Church of the Immaculate Conception, Clonakilty, County Cork
- Cloyne Cathedral, Cloyne, County Cork
- St Colman's Cathedral, Cobh, County Cork
- Presentation Brothers' Novitiate, Cork, County Cork
- Vincentians, Sunday's Well, County Cork
- St. Patrick's Church, Killygordan, County Donegal
- Cathedral of St Eunan and St Columba, Letterkenny, County Donegal
- Our Lady of Dolours Catholic Church, Dolphin's Barn, Dublin
- Church of the Sacred Heart, Donnybrook, County Dublin
- St. Ann's Church, Dublin, County Dublin
- St. Patrick's Church, Monkstown, County Dublin
- St. Peter's Church, Phibsborough, County Dublin
- St. Teresa's Church, Ardrahan, County Galway
- St. Mary's Church, Athenry, County Galway
- St. Mary's Church, Galway, County Galway
- Mausoleum Monivea, Monivea, County Galway
- Presentation Convent, Tralee, County Kerry
- St. Patrick's College, Maynooth, County Kildare
- Church of Saint Peter and Saint Paul, Monasterevin, County Kildare
- Catholic Church of Our Lady and St. David, Naas, County Kildare
- St. Conleth's Church, Newbridge, County Kildare
- Church of Our Lady of the Rosary and the Guardian Angels, Sallins, County Kildare
- St Canice's Cathedral, Kilkenny, County Kilkenny
- St. Michael's Church, Portarlington, County Laois
- St. Nicholas' Church, Adare, County Limerick
- Catholic Church of Our Lady of the Immaculate Conception, Ballingarry, County Limerick
- Church of Saint Patrick and Saint Brigid, Kilmallock, County Limerick
- Catholic Church of Our Lady of Lourdes, Limerick, County Limerick
- St. Brigid's Church, Ardagh, County Longford
- St. Matthew's Church, Ballymahon, County Longford
- Church of Our Lady of the Immaculate Conception, Castlebellingham, County Louth
- Church of Mary Immaculate, Collon, County Louth
- St. Mary's Church, Drogheda, County Louth
- St. Peter's Church, Drogheda, County Louth
- Dominican Church, Dundalk, County Louth
- St. Nicholas' Catholic Church, Dundalk, County Louth
- Church of the Immaculate Conception, Termonfeckin, County Louth
- St Muredach's Cathedral, Ballina, County Mayo
- Church of the Holy Rosary, Castlebar, County Mayo
- St. Mary's Church, Navan, County Meath
- St. Patrick's Church, Trim, County Meath
- St. Patrick's Church, Ballybay, County Monaghan
- St. Mary's Church, Castleblayney, County Monaghan
- Sacred Heart Catholic Church, Clones, County Monaghan
- Monaghan Cathedral, Monaghan, County Monaghan
- St. Brigid's Church, Clara, County Offaly
- Cathedral of St Nathy, Ballaghaderreen, County Roscommon
- Catholic Church of Our Lady of the Assumption, Collooney, County Sligo
- St. John's Church, Sligo, County Sligo
- St. Nicholas' Church, Carrick-on-Suir, County Tipperary
- St. Ailbe's Church, Emly, County Tipperary
- Church of St. Mary of the Rosary, Nenagh, County Tipperary
- St. Cronan's Church, Roscrea, County Tipperary
- Church of the Sacred Heart, Templemore, County Tipperary
- Cathedral of the Assumption, Thurles, County Tipperary
- St. Michael's Church, Tipperary, County Tipperary
- Catholic Church of the Holy Cross, Tramore, County Waterford
- Cathedral of the Most Holy Trinity, Waterford, County Waterford
- St. Mary's Church, Athlone, County Westmeath
- St. Aidan's Cathedral, Enniscorthy, County Wexford
- The Presentation Arts Centre, Enniscorthy, County Wexford
- Catholic Church of St. Mary and St. Michael, New Ross, County Wexford
- Church of the Immaculate Conception, Wexford, County Wexford
- St. Joseph's Church, Baltinglass, County Wicklow
- Church of St. Mary and St. Michael, Rathdrum, County Wicklow

=== Scotland ===
- St. Mary's Catholic Church, Fochabers, Moray

=== United States ===
- Christ the King Church, Mahwah, NJ
- Mary, Queen of Heaven Catholic Church, Jacksonville, Florida
- Our Lady of the Lake Church (Mandeville, Louisiana)
- Cathedral Church of the Advent, Birmingham, Alabama
- St. Elizabeth's Church, Greenville, Alabama
- Cathedral Basilica of the Immaculate Conception, Mobile, Alabama
- Basilica San Francisco de Asis, San Francisco, California
- Chapel on the Rock, Allenspark, Colorado
- Church of the Assumption, Ansonia, Connecticut
- Basilica of the Immaculate Conception, Jacksonville, Florida
- St. Edward's Catholic Church, Palm Beach, Florida
- St. Paul's Catholic Church, Pensacola, Florida
- Basilica of the Sacred Heart of Jesus, Atlanta, Georgia
- First United Methodist Church, Atlanta, Georgia
- First United Methodist Church, Santa Barbara, California
- Church of the Most Holy Trinity, Augusta, Georgia
- Mulberry Street United Methodist Church, Macon, Georgia
- St. Joseph's Catholic Church, Macon, Georgia
- Christ Church, St. Simons, Georgia
- Saint Joseph's Infirmary (Now Emory Saint Joseph's Hospital), Atlanta, Georgia
- St. Hyacinth's Basilica, Avondale, Illinois
- St. Alphonsus' Church, Chicago, Illinois
- St. Gertrude's Church, Chicago, Illinois
- First Presbyterian Church, Kankakee, Illinois
- St. Michael's Church, Old Town, Illinois
- St. Francis Chapel, Franciscan Health, Lafayette, Indiana
- Cathedral of the Epiphany, Sioux City, Iowa
- Immaculata Chapel, St. Marys, Kansas
- Cathedral Basilica of the Assumption, Covington, Kentucky
- Mother of God Catholic Church, Covington, Kentucky
- St. Catherine of Sienna's Church, Metairie, Louisiana
- St. Joseph's Catholic Church, Biddeford, Maine
- Shrine of the Sacred Heart Church, Baltimore, Maryland
- St. James' Church, Haverhill, Massachusetts
- St. Joseph's Catholic Church, Stockbridge, Massachusetts
- St. Mary's Church, Uxbridge, Massachusetts
- Cathedral of Saint Andrew, Grand Rapids, Michigan
- Sisters of the Sacred Heart of Mary Church, Monroe, Michigan
- Cathedral of the Nativity of the Blessed Virgin Mary, Biloxi, Mississippi
- St. Alphonsus Liguori Catholic Church (St. Louis), Missouri
- St. Thomas Aquinas' Church, Lincoln, Nebraska
- St. Frances Cabrini's Catholic Church, Omaha, Nebraska
- St. Stephen the Martyr's Catholic Church, Omaha, Nebraska
- Cathedral Basilica of the Sacred Heart (Newark), New Jersey
- Immaculate Conception Church, Montclair, New Jersey
- St. Mary's Church, Newark, New Jersey
- Cathedral Basilica of St. James, Brooklyn, New York State
- Corpus Christi Catholic Church, Buffalo, New York State
- St. Adalbert's Basilica, Buffalo, New York State
- St. Stanislaus' Church, Buffalo, New York State
- St. Matthew's Church, East Syracuse, New York State
- The Rosen House, Caramoor Center for Music & the Arts, Katonah, New York State
- St. John's Evangelical Lutheran Church, Manhattan, New York State
- Church of Saint Peter, Saratoga Springs, New York State
- St. Ann's Catholic Church, Staten Island, New York State
- The Episcopal Church of the Holy Innocents, Henderson, North Carolina
- St. Joseph's Catholic Church, Circleville, Ohio
- St. Stephen's Church, Johnstown, Pennsylvania
- Our Lady Help of Christians Church, Philadelphia, Pennsylvania
- St. Leo the Great's Catholic Church, Philadelphia, Pennsylvania
- St. Paul's Cathedral, Pittsburgh, Pennsylvania
- St. Mary's Church, Bristol, Rhode Island
- St. Mary's Church, Newport, Rhode Island
- St. Mary Help of Christians Church, Aiken, South Carolina
- Cathedral of St. John the Baptist, Charleston, South Carolina
- St. Mary's Catholic Church, Charleston, South Carolina
- St. Matthew's German Evangelical Lutheran Church, Charleston, South Carolina
- St. Timothy's Episcopal Church, Columbia, South Carolina
- Christ Church, Greenville, South Carolina
- St. James' Episcopal Church, Greenville, South Carolina
- St. Mary's Catholic Church, Greenville, South Carolina
- Dominican Sisters of St. Cecilia, Nashville, Tennessee
- St. Joseph's Catholic Church, Houston, Texas
- Christ and St. Luke's Church, Norfolk, Virginia
- Sacred Heart Church, Norfolk, Virginia
- St. Joseph's Villa, Richmond, Virginia
- Dahlgren Chapel of the Sacred Heart, Washington, D.C.
- Trinity Episcopal Church, Seattle, Washington State
- St. Mary Star of the Sea, Brooklyn, New York State
- Cathedral of Our Lady of Lourdes, Spokane WA
- Trinity Evangelical Lutheran Church, Staten Island, New York State

== See also ==
- Franz Xaver Zettler, glass painter and Mayer's son-in-law
