= Balnacoul Halt railway station =

Disused railway station in Mosstodloch, Moray

Balnacoul Halt
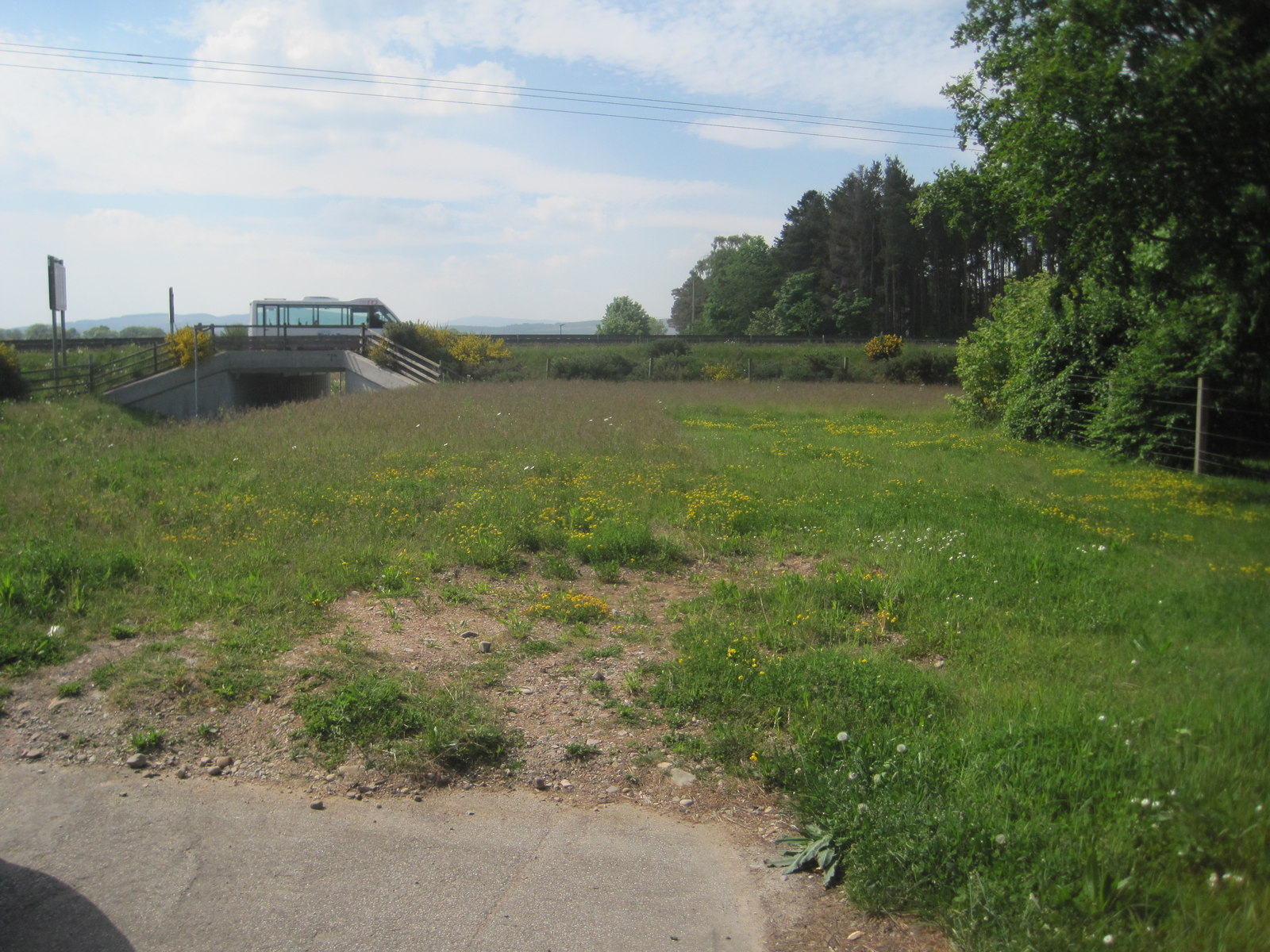
- The site of the station, looking south, in 2017

General information
- Location: Mosstodloch, Moray; Scotland
- Coordinates: 57.623°N 3.1277°W
- Grid reference: NJ327597
- Platforms: 2

Other information
- Status: Disused

History
- Original company: Highland Railway
- Pre-grouping: Highland Railway
- Post-grouping: London, Midland and Scottish Railway

Key dates
- 23 October 1893: Opened as Balnacoul Platform
- 1904: Name changed to Balnacoul
- 1928: Name changed to Balnacoul Halt
- 14 September 1931: Closed
Location

Balnacoul Halt railway station served the village of Mosstodloch, Moray, Scotland from 1893 to 1931 on the Inverness and Aberdeen Junction Railway.

== History ==
The station opened as Balnacoul Platform on 23 October 1893 by the Highland Railway. The suffix 'platform' was dropped in 1904 but 'halt' was added in 1928. The station closed to both passengers and goods traffic on 14 September 1931.

Preceding station	Historical railways	Following station
Fochabers Town; Line and station closed	Highland Railway; Inverness and Aberdeen Junction Railway	Orbliston Junction; Line and station closed
