= St Mary's, Fochabers =

- St Mary's Roman Catholic Church, Fochabers
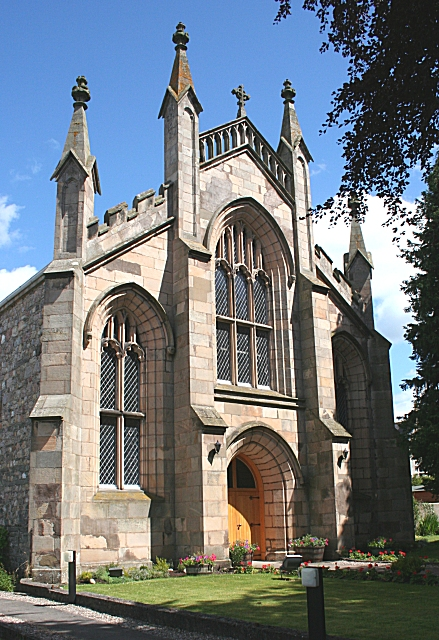
- St Mary's, Fochabers
- 57.6127°N 3.0952°W
- Location: Fochabers, Moray
- Country: Scotland
- Denomination: Roman Catholic
- Website: Official website

History
- Status: Parish church

Architecture
- Functional status: Active
- Architect(s): Bishop James Kyle and J Gillespie Graham
- Architectural type: Church
- Style: Gothic
- Groundbreaking: 1825
- Completed: 1826

Administration
- Diocese: Aberdeen
- Deanery: St. Peter's

Clergy
- Priest: Fr Tadeusz Turski

St Mary's, Fochabers is a Roman Catholic church in the village of Fochabers, Moray, in Scotland and is a part of the RC Diocese of Aberdeen. The building is significant for the high quality of its altar and stained glass windows. It is an active parish church served from Buckie with regular weekly Sunday Mass at 10.00 am.

Fochabers, and the broader Bog o' Gight area, had been a hotbed of Catholic recusancy as the Gordon family of Gordon Castle had clung to the Catholic faith from 1560 to 1728. Prior to this building there had been a chapel in the old village of Fochabers, which had been spared burning by the Duke of Cumberland's troops after the Jacobite rebellion of 1745. , and later the area was served by the mission at St Ninian's Church, Tynet.

The church was completed in 1826, the architect being James Gillespie Graham, with the foundation stone being laid by Father George Mathieson, who was born in Fochabers himself, in 1825. Fr Mathieson said of the new building that it will be 'an ornament to the town, and I hope draw respect to Religion'. In 1885 a reredos by Peter Paul Pugin was installed. Later, in memory of the Clapperton family, two stained glass windows designed by the acclaimed Franz Mayer & Co. were fitted, one with a paschal theme and one with a Marian theme.

== Images of the Interior ==
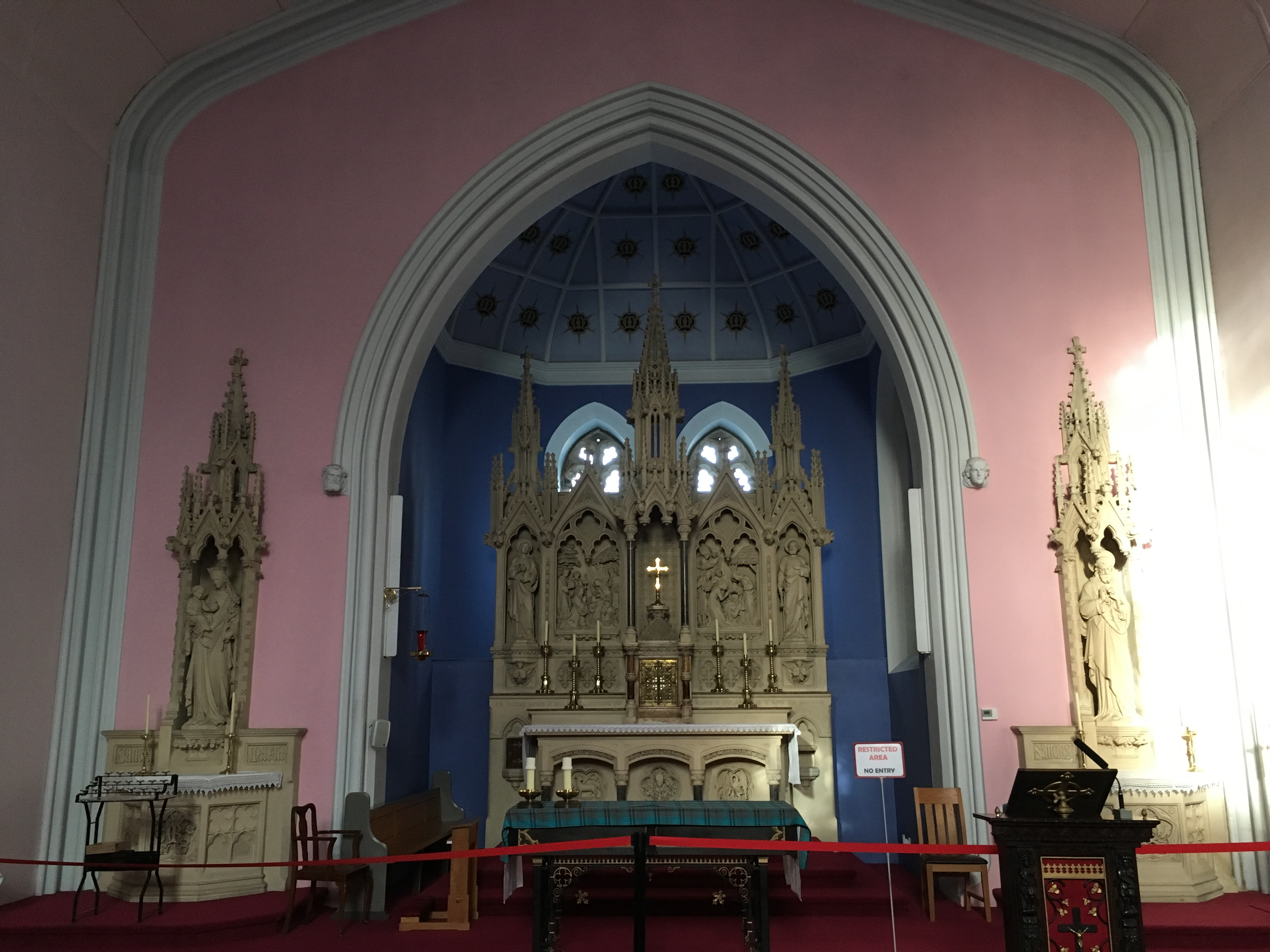
Chancel featuring the Pugin altar

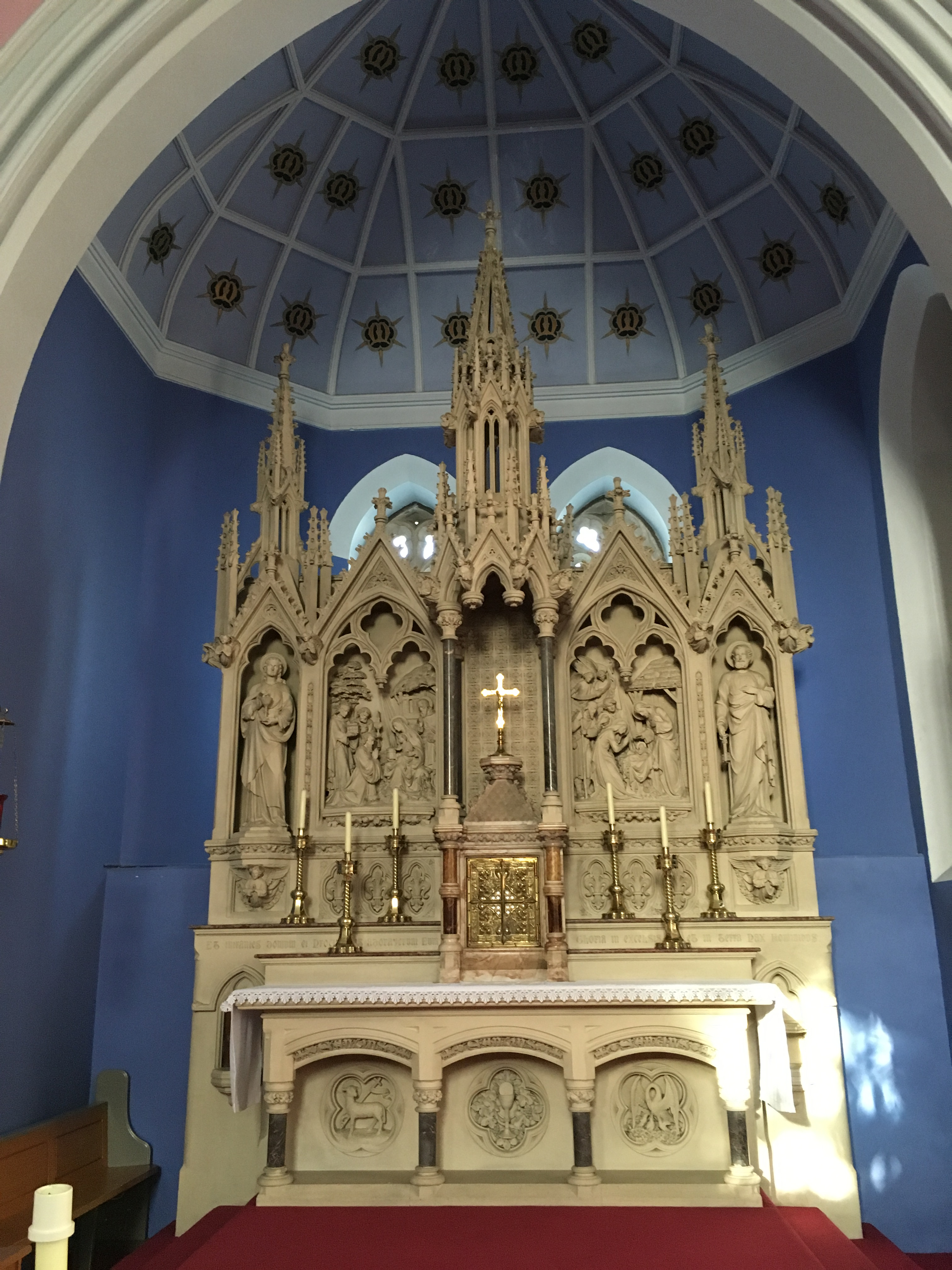
Pugin altar

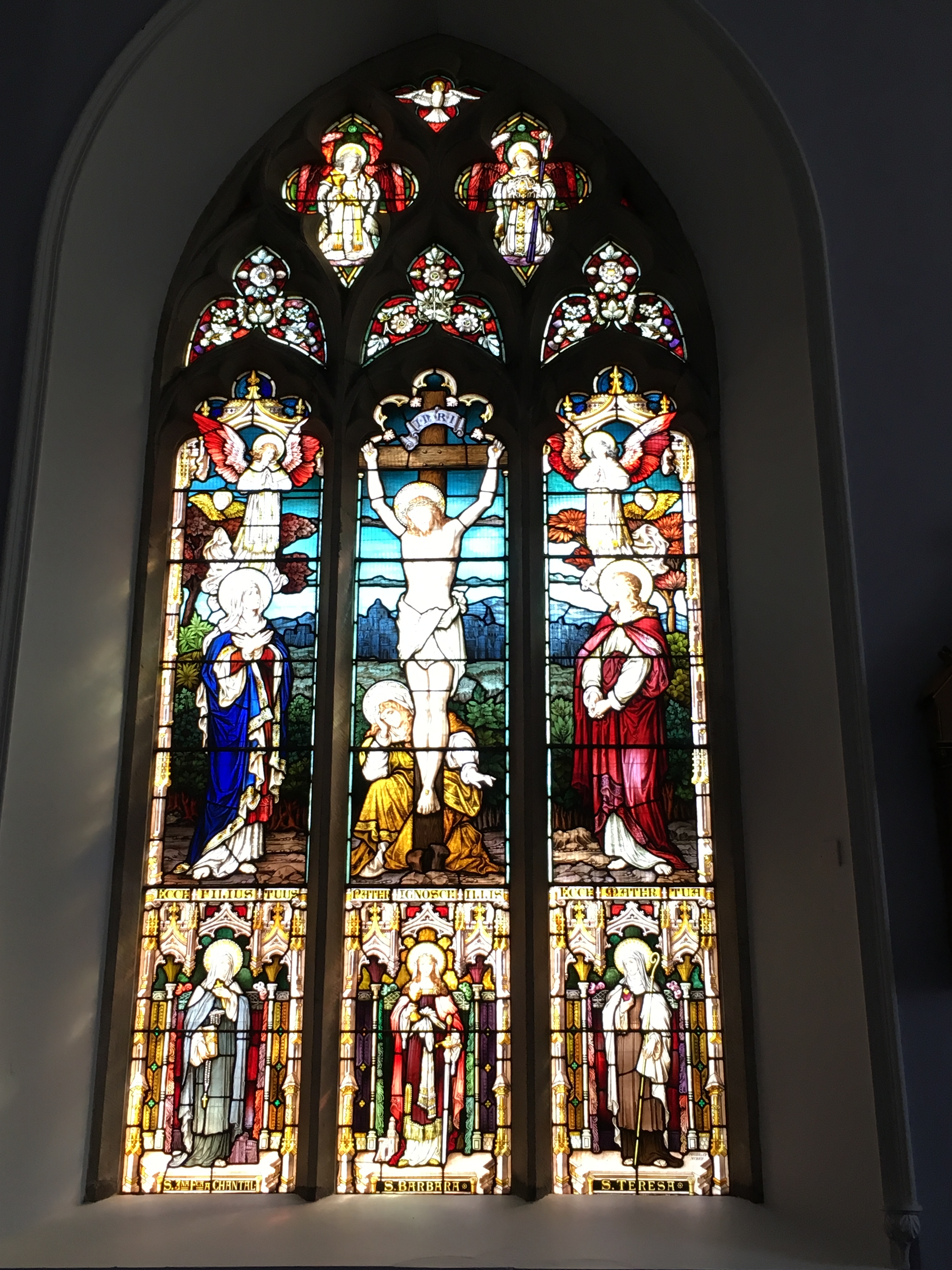
Franz Mayer & Co. window.

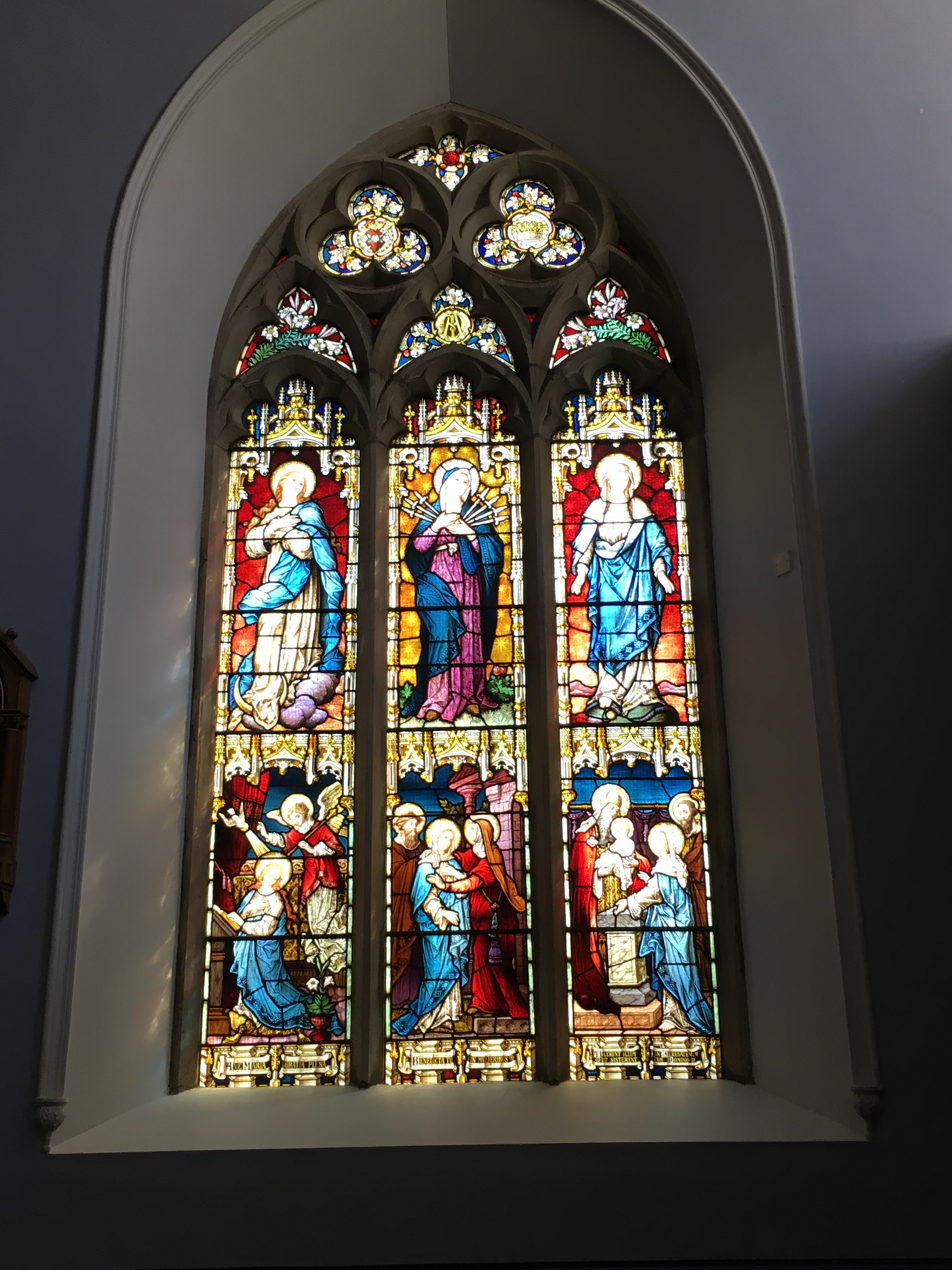
Franz Mayer & Co. window.
