= Lhanbryde railway station =

Disused railway station in Lhanbryde, Moray

Lhanbryde
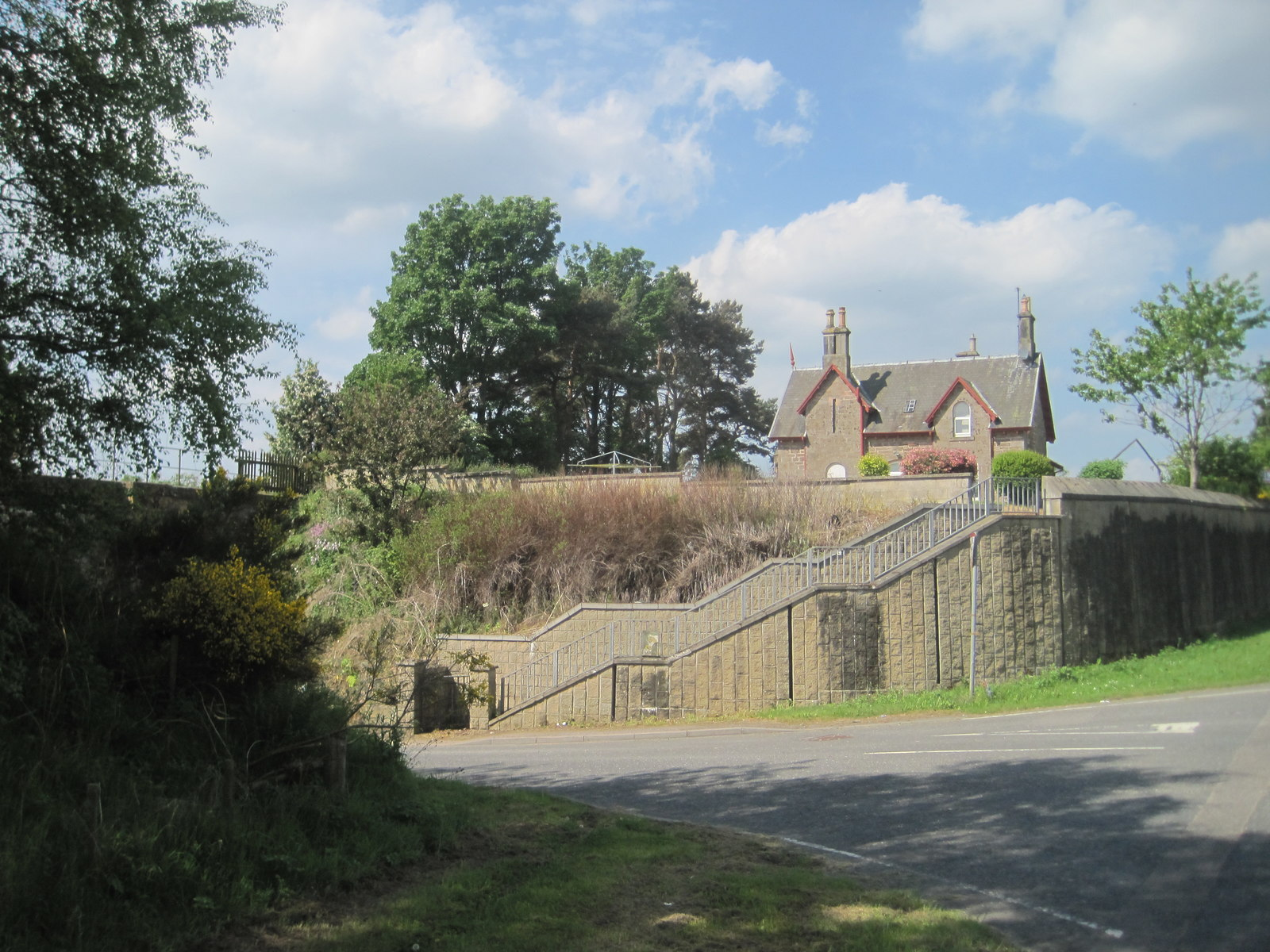
- The site of the station, looking west towards Elgin, in 2017

General information
- Location: Lhanbryde, Moray; Scotland
- Coordinates: 57.6334°N 3.2227°W
- Grid reference: NJ270610
- Platforms: 2

Other information
- Status: Disused

History
- Original company: Inverness and Aberdeen Junction Railway
- Pre-grouping: Highland Railway
- Post-grouping: London, Midland and Scottish Railway

Key dates
- 18 August 1858: Opened
- 7 December 1964: Closed
Location

Lhanbryde railway station served the village of Lhanbryde, Moray, Scotland from 1858 to 1964 on the Inverness and Aberdeen Junction Railway.

== History ==
The station opened on 18 August 1858 by the Inverness and Aberdeen Junction Railway. The station closed to both passengers, and goods traffic on 7 December 1964. The site is now a private residence.

Preceding station	Historical railways	Following station
Elgin; Line open, station open	Highland Railway; Inverness and Aberdeen Junction Railway	Orbliston Junction; Line open, station closed
