= Fochabers Town railway station =

Disused railway station in Fochabers, Moray

Fochabers Town
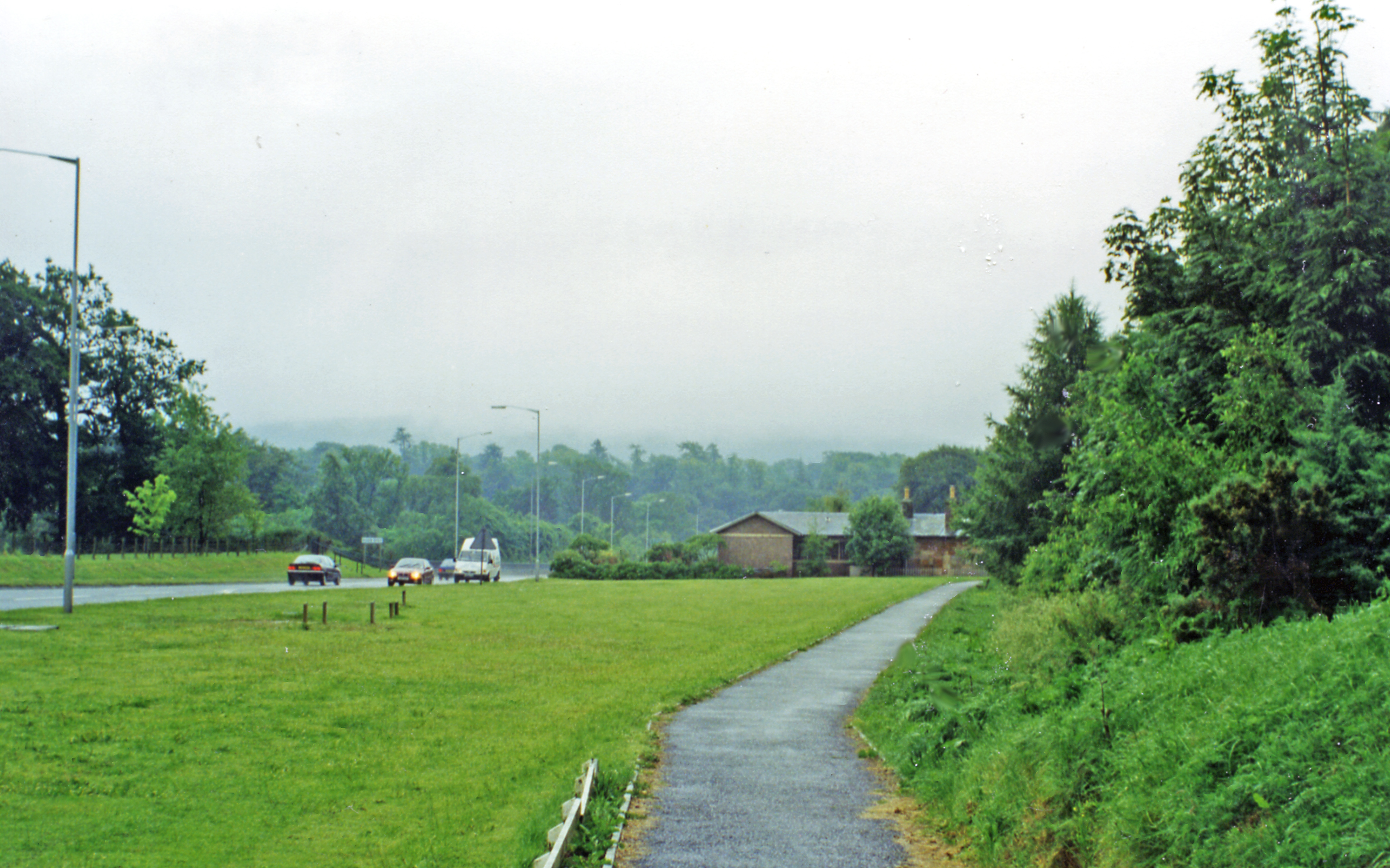
- The site of the station in 1997

General information
- Location: Fochabers, Moray; Scotland
- Coordinates: 57.6211°N 3.1086°W
- Grid reference: NJ338595
- Platforms: 1

Other information
- Status: Disused

History
- Original company: Highland Railway
- Pre-grouping: Highland Railway
- Post-grouping: London, Midland and Scottish Railway

Key dates
- 23 October 1893: Opened as Fochabers
- 1 July 1894: Name changed to Fochabers Town
- 14 September 1931: Closed to passengers
- 28 March 1966: Closed completely
Location

Fochabers Town railway station served the village of Fochabers, Moray, Scotland from 1893 to 1966 on the Inverness and Aberdeen Junction Railway.

== History ==
The station opened as Fochabers on 23 October 1893 by the Highland Railway. It was situated as a terminus of a branch line from Orbliston Junction The name was changed to Fochabers Town on 1 July 1894. The station closed to passengers on 14 September 1931 and to goods traffic on 28 March 1966.

Preceding station	Historical railways	Following station
Terminus	Highland Railway; Inverness and Aberdeen Junction Railway	Balnacoul Halt; Line and station closed
