= Alexander Milne (entrepreneur) =

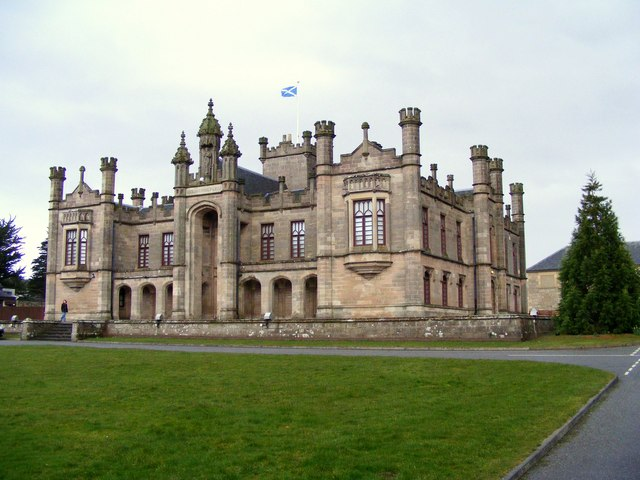
- Milne's Institute, the free school for children of Fochabers bequeathed by Alexander Milne
- Born: 1742; Fochabers, Moray, Scotland
- Died: October 1838 (aged 95–96); New Orleans, Louisiana, U.S.
- Occupation: entrepreneur
- Known for: philanthropy

Alexander Milne (1742–1838) was a Scottish American entrepreneur and philanthropist and was born in Fochabers, Moray, Scotland. He was employed as a footman by the Duke of Richmond and Gordon and when ordered by the duke to powder his red hair, Milne declined, left his employment and emigrated to the American colonies. By 1776, Milne had moved to New Orleans in Louisiana (New Spain), where, after doing well in the hardware business, he set up a brick-making company using mainly slave labour—by the late 18th century most of the brick used in New Orleans was made at his works.

== Appearance ==
Milne was said to be small in stature with a drooping head and his eyes continuously focused on the ground and apparently heedless of things going on around him. Although his dress was shabby causing him on occasion to be mistaken for a beggar he was well regarded by those who knew him.

== Real estate investments ==
The Spanish Government granted Milne large tracts of swamp lands bordering on Lake Pontchartrain and seeing the potential for development continued to invest heavily in the area right up until his death. He owned large quantities of land in his own establishment town of Milneburg (now a section of New Orleans) and according to Kendall, in the course of one week disposed of some of his landholdings realising $3,000,000. He continued to invest in property in New Orleans and at his death, his real estate properties were worth more than $2,000,000.

== Death and bequests ==
Milne died in October 1838 and was buried in Saint Louis No. 2 Cemetery, New Orleans having made his will only three years earlier. In the will he bequeathed $30,000 to his relatives in his home town of Fochabers, Scotland; he freed his two house servants, gave them land on Esplanade Avenue and ensured that $10,000 would be provided to build two brick houses for them and until such time as the houses were built his executors would pay them $3 per day to support them. The remainder of the will was sectioned into five parts; $100,000 was provided for the founding of a free school for the boys and girls in Fochabers and surrounding area; to the other four his will stated the following:

"It is my positive wish and intention that an asylum for destitute orphan boys and another for the relief of destitute orphan girls shall be established at Milneburg, in this parish, under the name of the Milne Asylum for Destitute Orphan Boys and the Milne Asylum for Destitute Orphan Girls; and that my executors shall cause the same to be duly incorporated by the proper authorities of this state; and to the said contemplated institutions, and to the present institution of the society for the relief of destitute orphan boys of the City of Lafayette and parish of Jefferson in this state; and to the Poydras Female Asylum in this city I give and bequeath in equal shares or interests of one-fourth to each, all my lands on Bayou St. Joseph and on the Lake Pontchartrain, including the unsold land of Milneburg."

== Dispute regarding legality of Fochabers bequest ==
Louisiana state law prohibited foreign legatees from being able to inherit if the laws of the country in which the legatee resided prevented a citizen of Louisiana from receiving a similar inheritance. Scots Law allowed only British citizens to inherit a legacy. Lengthy litigation was brought by the Duke of Richmond and Gordon on behalf of the town of Fochabers. Louisiana courts twice ruled that the legacy could not be granted but eventually on appeal to the Supreme Court of Louisiana, the bequest was finally allowed.

== See also ==
- Milne's High School
- Milneburg

== Sources ==
- Kendall, John (1922), History of New Orleans, Chicago & New York: The Lewis Publishing Company
