= Orbliston Junction railway station =

Former railway station in the Highlands of Scotland

Orbliston Junction
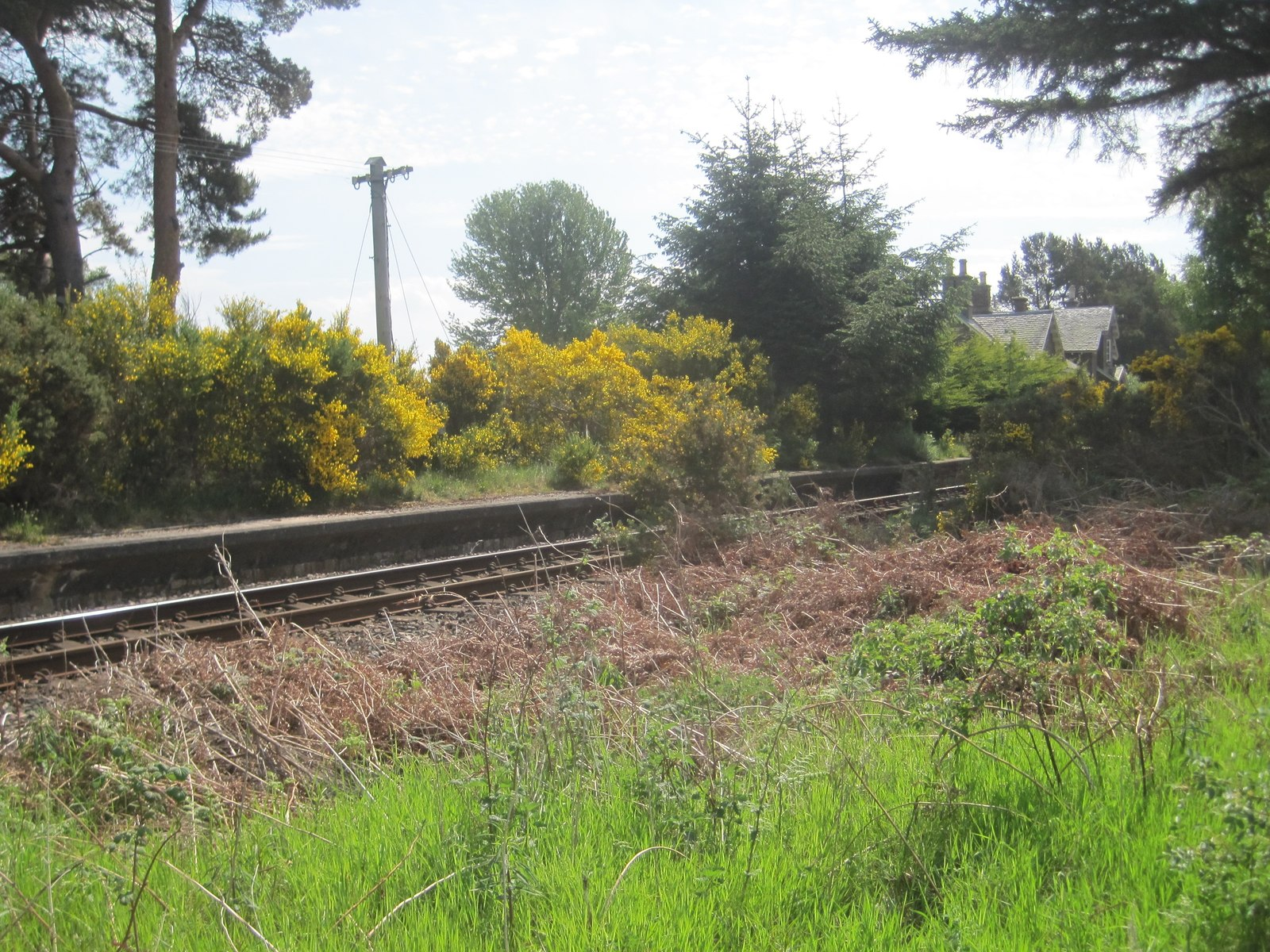
- Orbliston Junction railway station site

General information
- Location: Orbliston, Moray; Scotland
- Coordinates: 57.6088°N 3.166°W
- Grid reference: NJ304582
- Platforms: 2

Other information
- Status: Disused

History
- Original company: Inverness and Aberdeen Junction Railway
- Pre-grouping: Highland Railway
- Post-grouping: London, Midland and Scottish Railway

Key dates
- 18 August 1858: Opened as Fochabers
- 16 October 1893: Name changed to Orbliston Junction
- 12 September 1960: Name changed to Orbliston
- 7 December 1964: Closed
Location

Orbliston Junction railway station served the settlement of Orbliston, Moray, Scotland from 1858 to 1964 on the Inverness and Aberdeen Junction Railway.

== History ==
The station opened on 18 August 1858 by the Inverness and Aberdeen Junction Railway, named Fochabers, though it was 4 km west of the town. Its name was changed to Orbliston Junction on 16 October 1893, when the Highland Railway opened the Fochabers branch line. The branch closed to passengers in 1931, but the name didn't change to Orbliston until 12 September 1960. The station closed to both passengers and goods traffic on 7 December 1964.

Preceding station	Historical railways	Following station
Orton; Station closed; Line open	Highland Railway; Inverness and Aberdeen Junction Railway	Lhanbryde; Station closed; Line open
Orton; Station closed; Line open	Highland Railway; Fochabers Branch	Balnacoul Halt; Line and station closed
