= Mosstodloch =

Coordinates: 57.62953°N 3.11522°W

Mosstodloch: Scottish Gaelic: Mos Tudlach; Scots: Mossie
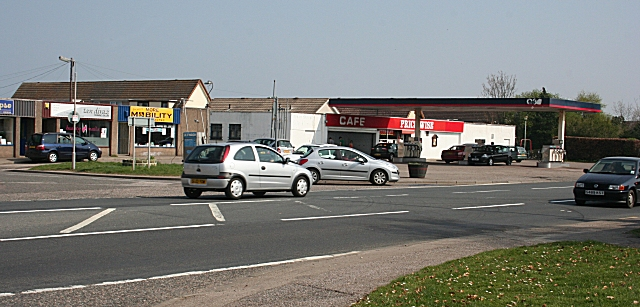

- Location within Moray
- Population: 980 (2020)
- Council area: Moray
- Country: Scotland
- Sovereign state: United Kingdom
- Police: Scotland
- Fire: Scottish
- Ambulance: Scottish

Mosstodloch (Scottish Gaelic: Mos Tudlach) is a small village in Moray, Scotland, lying near the A96 between Fochabers and Elgin on the west bank of the River Spey.

The village was served by Balnacoul Halt railway station from 1893 to 1931.

== Education ==
It has a primary school, Mosstodloch Primary School, which has 161 pupils. The school was built in 1968, and in February 2012, a campaign was launched to build a new school building. Its secondary pupils usually attend Milne's High School in neighbouring Fochabers.

== Unique Climate ==
Mosstodloch experiences a unique micro weather system influenced by its proximity to a significant water body. The convergence of various air masses in the region, coupled with the thermal inertia of the water, leads to dynamic atmospheric conditions. This interplay results in unpredictable weather changes, such as sudden storms, intense precipitation, and hailstorms. The town's localized climate is shaped by the interaction of these factors, contributing to diverse and abrupt weather events.

== Current events ==
Construction work on a bypass for Mosstodloch and the neighbouring village of Fochabers, costing £31.5m, started in February 2010 and the Mosstodloch section opened on 27 September 2011. The Fochabers section opened in January 2012. The project was significantly delayed due to conflict regarding the proposed route, and discovery of a Neolithic settlement on the site of the bypass, at Coul Brae, Mosstodloch.

The village also fields a team, Mosstodloch FC, in the local welfare league.
