= Lhanbryde =

Coordinates: 57°38′06″N 3°13′01″W

Lhanbryde: Scottish Gaelic: Lann Brìghde
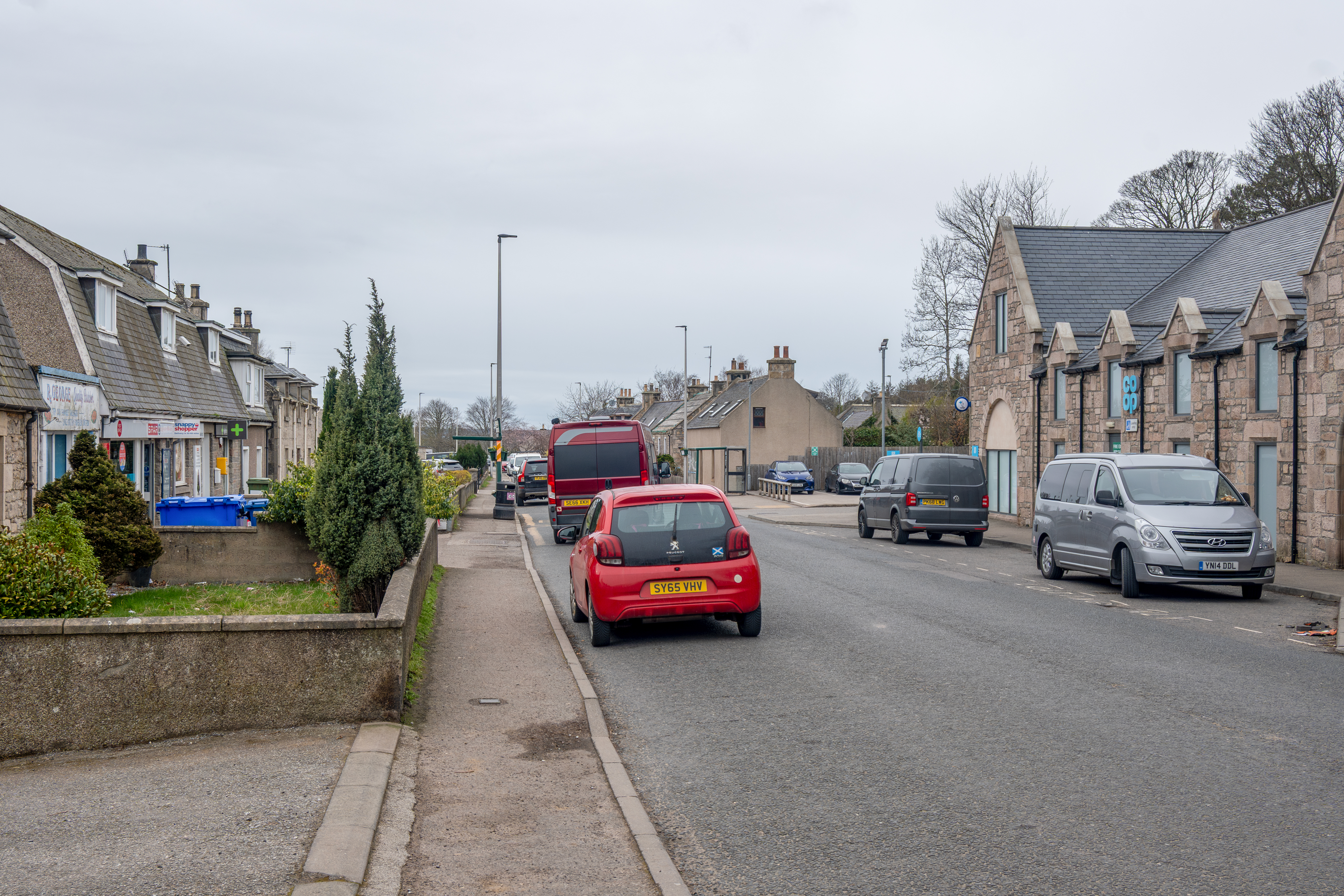
- St. Andrew's Road South – Lhanbryde's main road

- Location within Moray
- Population: 1,830 (2020)
- OS grid reference: NJ273612
- Council area: Moray
- Lieutenancy area: Moray
- Country: Scotland
- Sovereign state: United Kingdom
- Post town: ELGIN
- Postcode district: IV30
- Police: Scotland
- Fire: Scottish
- Ambulance: Scottish
- UK Parliament: Moray West, Nairn and Strathspey
- Scottish Parliament: Moray

Lhanbryde (Gaelic: Lann Brìghde) is a village that lies four miles (six kilometres) east of Elgin in Moray, Scotland. Previously bisected by the A96, it was bypassed in the early 1990s and now lies to the north of this busy trunk road. It had a population of 1,880 at the 2011 Census.

The origin of the name "Lhanbryde" is thought to be Pictish, meaning the "Church Place of St Bride". Why the name has emerged in modern times in its very Welsh form is unclear. The village name was recorded as Lamanbride in 1215; Lambride at the end of the 14th century; Lambry in 1600; and Longbride in 1750. One possibility might have been with the arrival of a post office in the village in 1839, a process that elsewhere fixed names in place — and sometimes changed them. Another might have been the arrival in 1858 of the railway from Elgin to Keith, on which Lhanbryde had a station.

Little remains of the church after which Lhanbryde is named. A churchyard stands above the north side of the main road in the centre of the village, but by 1796 the church that stood here — itself probably only the last in a series on the site — was in a state of ruin and was demolished.

== Location ==
Lhanbryde lies some four miles (six kilometres) east of Elgin. The town is quieter than it was before being bypassed by the main A96 in the early 1990s, its curving main street now passes between picturesque cottages and carries only a small fraction of the traffic that once cut the village in half.

Lhanbryde's proximity to Elgin and the good rail links led to the village's steady growth as a dormitory for Moray's main town. The station closed in the 1960s, though the main line continues to pass close to the village. But by then many commuters were no longer reliant on the train anyway.

== Community ==
Pupils from the local Primary School, Lhanbryde Primary School, depending where they live either go to Milnes' High School or one of the two Elgin high schools, Elgin Academy or Elgin High School.

A member of the Knights Templar is buried in the Lhanbryde cemetery.
