= Kintessack =

Locality in Moray, Scotland

Coordinates: 57°37′17″N 3°40′25″W

Kintessack (Note: Previously also spelt Kintessock or Kintessoch) is a small village in Moray, Scotland 3 miles (4.8 km) north-west of Forres. It is located in the parish of Dyke and Moy,

== History ==
The Murray of Culbin family held the lands in the 13th century.
