= Milne's High School =

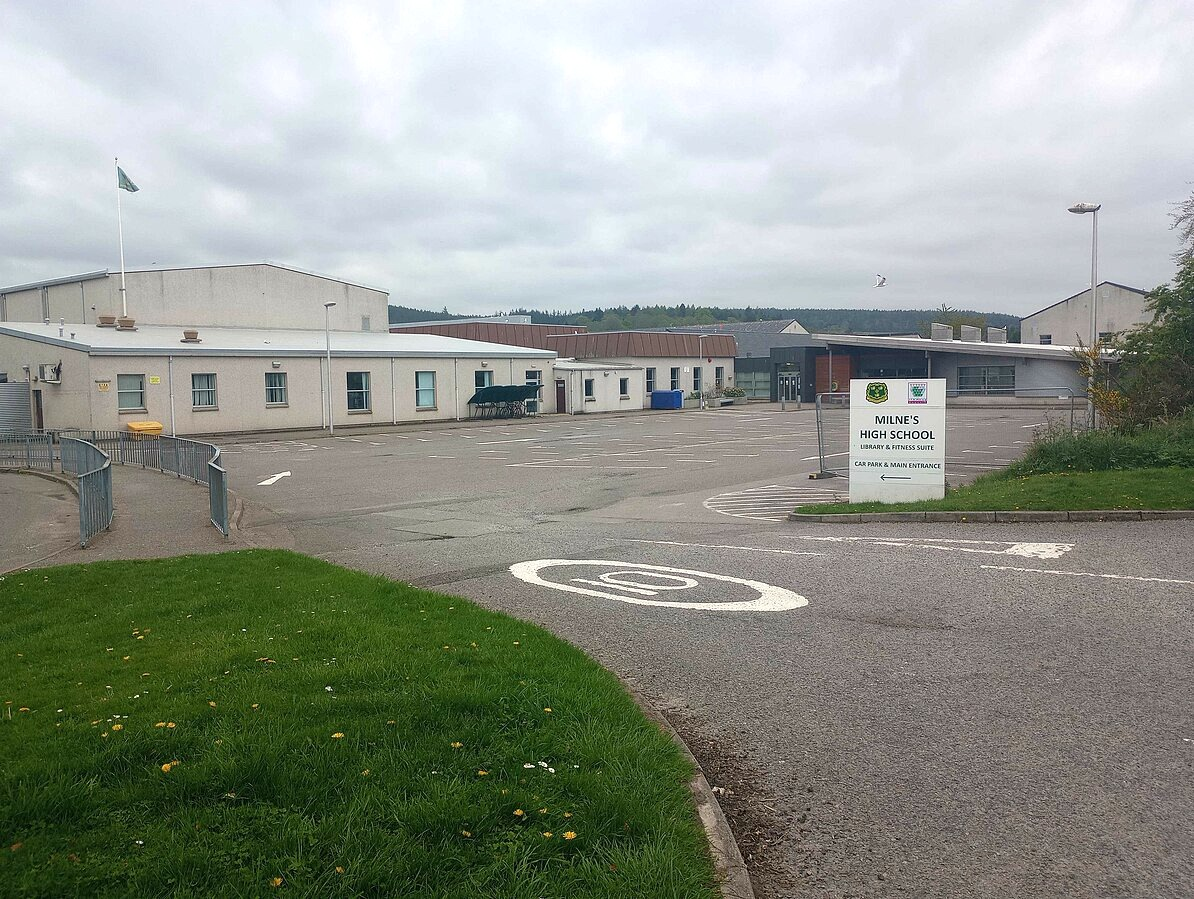

Location
- West Street; Fochabers, Moray, IV32 7DJ; Scotland
- 57°36′35″N 3°6′1″W

Information
- Type: Secondary school
- Motto: Alacriate Ac Studio (With speed and zeal)
- Established: 1846
- Founder: Alexander Milne
- Local authority: The Moray Council
- Head teacher: Natalie Munro
- Gender: Any
- Age range: 11-18
- Houses: Spey 1; Spey 2; Tynet 1; Tynet 2; Inchberry
- Website: www.milneshighschool.org.uk

Milne's High School is a secondary school in Fochabers, Moray, Scotland.

The school's feeder primaries are Milne's Primary School, Lhanbryde Primary School and Mosstodloch Primary School. The current head teacher is Natalie Munro.

== History ==
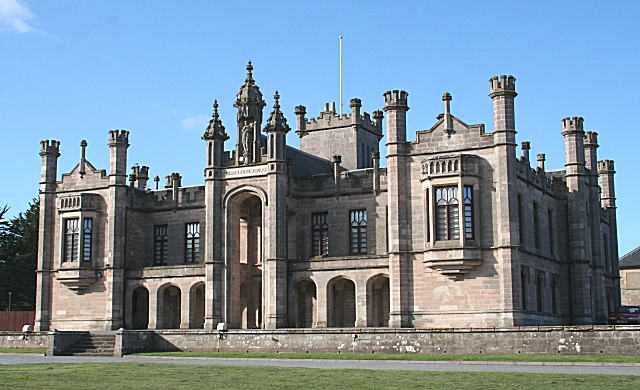
The original Milne's High School buildings, now Milne's Primary School.

Milnes High School was bequeathed by entrepreneur Alexander Milne and was built in 1846 to a design by Thomas Mackenzie. The building was superseded as the secondary school when the new Milne's High School was built, being completed in 1989.

In 2014, an education review suggested that Milne's be closed and its pupils attend neighbouring schools. This suggestion was responded to poorly by the local residents, and many locals primarily from Fochabers and Mosstodloch showed up in protest to prevent the decision for the school's closure to be made. The protests were joined by then Member of Parliament for Moray, Angus Robertson. A final decision was made in November 2014 guaranteeing it would be kept open.

== List of head teachers ==
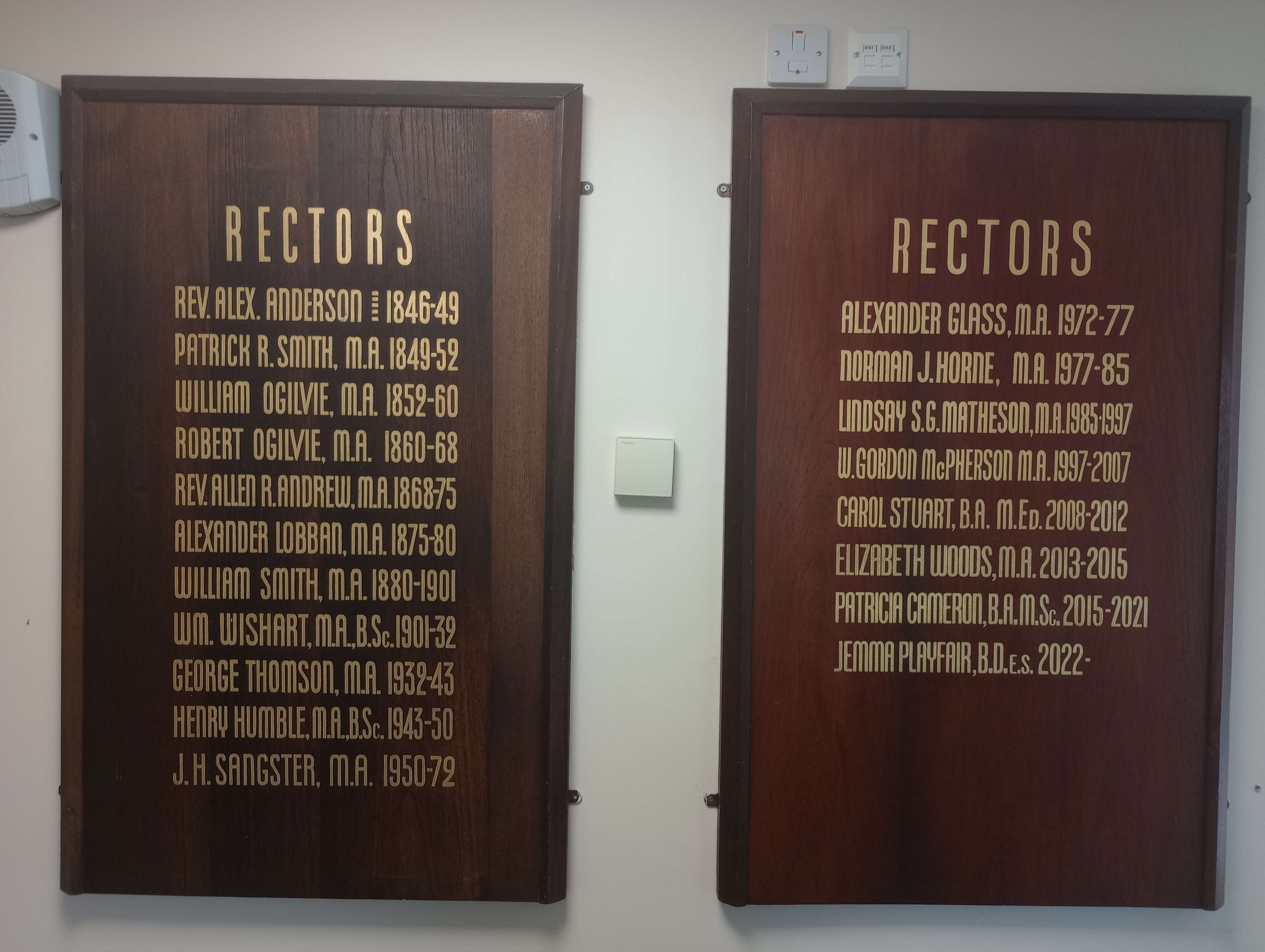
Plaque of the list of rectors of Milne's High School

List of head teachers (1846–present)
Name	Term	Ref
Alex Anderson	1846–1849	
Patrick R. Smith	1849–1852	
William Ogilvie	1852–1860	
Robert Ogilvie	1860–1868	
Allen R. Andrew	1868–1875	
Alexander Lobban	1875–1880	
William Smith	1880–1901	
WM. Wishart	1901–1932	
George Thomson	1932–1943	
Henry Humble	1943–1950	
J.H. Sangster	1950–1972	
Alexander Glass	1972–1977	
Norman J. Horne	1977–1985	
Lindsay S.G. Matheson	1985–1997	
Gordon McPherson	1997–2007	
Carol Stuart	2008–2012	
Elizabeth Woods	2013–2015	
Patricia Cameron	2015–2021	
C. Boyle	2021–2022	
Jemma Playfair	2022–2026	
Natalie Munro	2026–present	
