= Fochabers =

Coordinates: 57°36′44″N 3°05′49″W

Fochabers: Scottish Gaelic: Fothabair
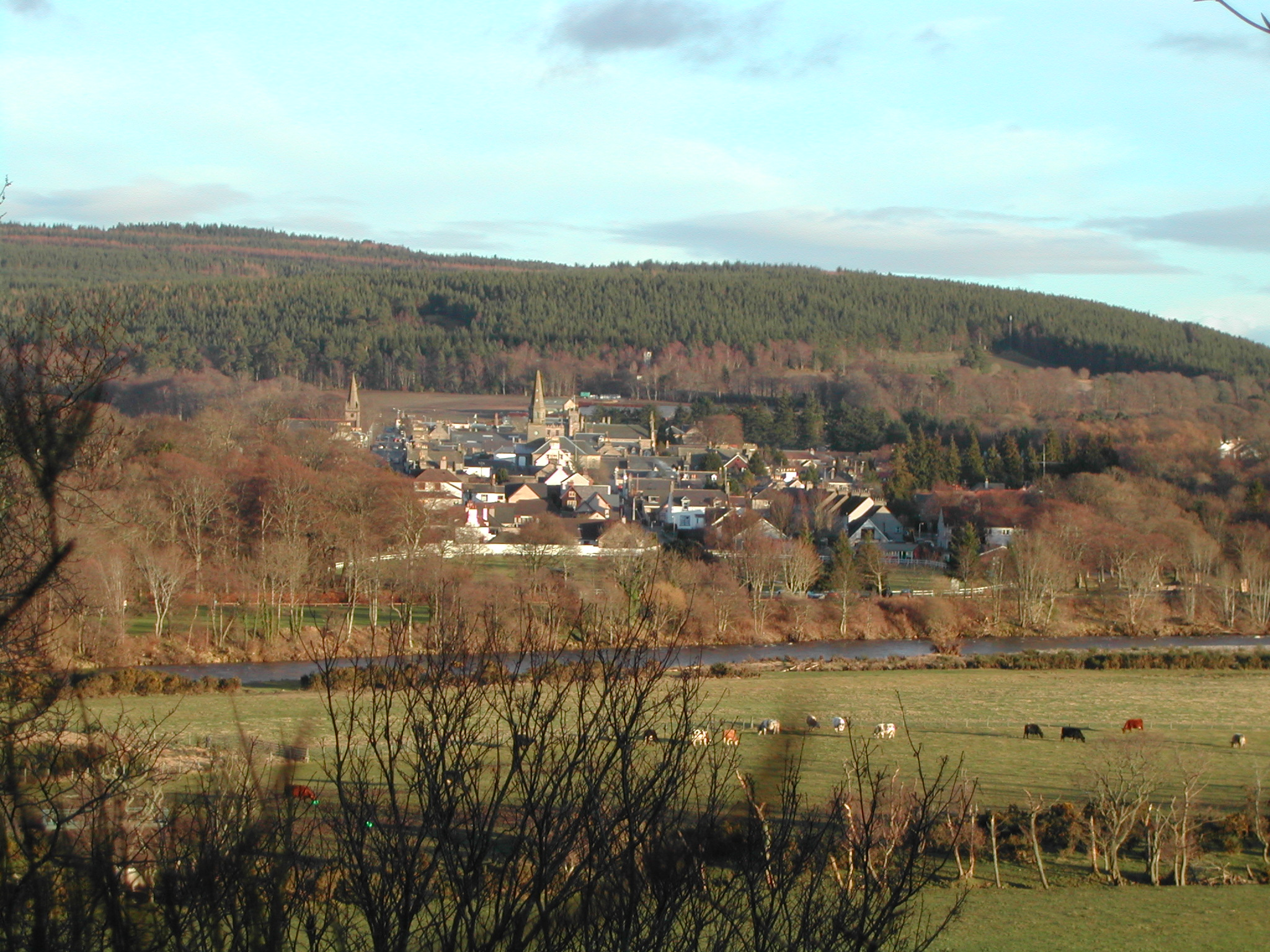
- Fochabers village, beside the River Spey

- Location within Moray
- Population: 1,770 (2020)
- OS grid reference: NJ345585
- Council area: Moray
- Lieutenancy area: Moray
- Country: Scotland
- Sovereign state: United Kingdom
- Post town: Fochabers
- Postcode district: IV32
- Dialling code: 01343
- Police: Scotland
- Fire: Scottish
- Ambulance: Scottish
- UK Parliament: Moray West, Nairn and Strathspey
- Scottish Parliament: Moray

Fochabers (/ˈfɒxəbərz/; Scottish Gaelic: Fachabair or Fothabair) is a village in the Parish of Bellie, in Moray, Scotland, 10 miles (16 km) east of the cathedral city of Elgin and located on the east bank of the River Spey. 1,728 people live in the village, which enjoys a rich musical and cultural history. The village is also home to Baxters, the family-run manufacturer of foodstuffs.

The present village owes its existence to the 4th Duke of Gordon (1743–1827). During the late eighteenth century, during the Scottish Enlightenment, it was fashionable for landowners to found new towns and villages; these can be recognised all over Scotland, because unlike their predecessors they all have straight, wide streets in mainly rectangular layouts, a central square, and the houses built with their main elevations parallel to the street.

Fochabers was founded in 1776, and is one of the best examples of a planned village. It is a conservation area, with most of the buildings in the High Street listed as being of historical or architectural interest, as is Bellie Kirk, the Roman Catholic church St Mary's Fochabers, which houses works by notable craftsmen, and the Episcopalian church, Gordon Chapel, which boasts the largest collection of Pre-Raphaelite stained glass in Scotland.

The population in 1841 was 1,135 inhabitants.

Electricity was brought to the village in 1906 by the 7th Duke of Richmond, supplied from a small hydro-electric generating station built in 1905 in the Quarters district on the banks of the fast-flowing Spey. For a time in the mid-twentieth century, Fochabers was the home of three duchesses – Hilda, Duchess of Richmond and Gordon; Ivy, Duchess of Portland and Helen, Duchess of Northumberland. Between 1893 and 1966 the village had a railway station, Fochabers Town, although after 1931 this was open only to freight.

For nearly three decades, the people of Fochabers campaigned for a bypass, as the village is situated on the A96, the only direct route from Aberdeen to Inverness, and consequently suffered from serious traffic problems. Construction work on a bypass for Fochabers and the neighbouring village of Mosstodloch started on 2 February 2010 and was completed in January 2012, at a cost of £31,500,000. The project was significantly delayed due to conflict regarding the proposed route, and discovery of a Neolithic settlement on the site of the bypass.

== Education ==
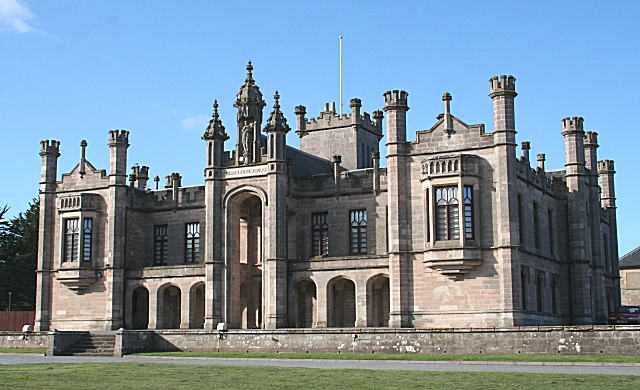
Milne's Primary School.

There are two schools in Fochabers, Milne's Primary School (formerly Milne's Institution) and Milne's High School, which currently serves approximately 300 pupils from Fochabers itself and the surrounding villages and farms. Milne's Institution was originally built in 1846, in accordance with Alexander Milne's Last Will and Testament, using £20,000 (~£2,700,000 today) he left for this purpose.

== Notable people ==
- John M. Caie (1878–1949), civil servant and poet, author of The Puddock
- Sir James Cantlie FRCS KBE (1851–1926), co-founder of the Royal Society of Tropical Medicine and Hygiene
- George Chalmers (1742–1825), antiquarian and political writer
- Arthur Robertson Cushny FRS (1866–1926), professor of pharmacology at Universities of Michigan, US; London and Edinburgh; pioneer in the study of human renal function
- Fiona Mackenzie (b. 1961), Gaelic singer and Mòd Gold Medal winner from Orton, Fochabers
- Fish (b. 1958), lead singer of Marillion, acquired his nickname while living in Fochabers
- William Marshall (Scottish composer) (1748–1833), composer of Scottish fiddle music
- Jane Maxwell (1748–1812), fourth Duchess of Gordon
- Alexander Milne (1742–1838), Scottish-American entrepreneur and philanthropist
- George Muirhead FRSE (1845–1928), naturalist and Commissioner to the Duke of Gordon
- Sir James Sivewright KCMG (1848–1916), telegraph and railway pioneer in South Africa; Cape Colony politician and member of Cecil Rhodes' cabinet
- Allan Wilson (1856 – 1893), major in the Victoria Volunteers and commander of the infamous Shangani Patrol, whose last stand fighting overwhelming odds made him a national hero in Britain and Rhodesia.
- Kyle Macaulay (b. 1986), Scottish former professional footballer
