= Leaders' Council (United Kingdom) =

English local government forum

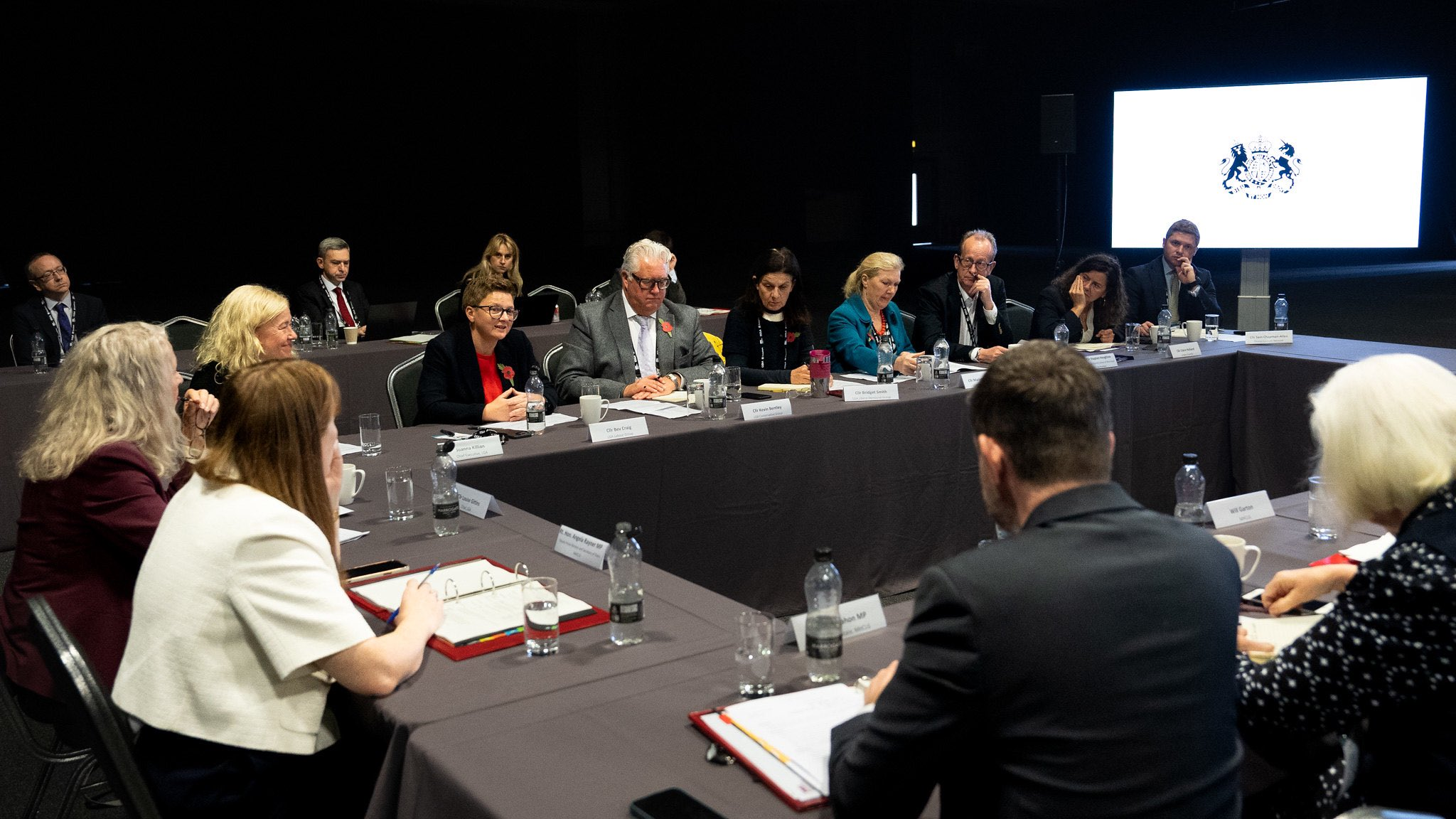
- Leaders' Council meeting, 24 October 2024
- Purpose: Local government representation
- Region served: United Kingdom
- Chair: Secretary of State for Housing, Communities and Local Government
- Website: Leaders' Council

The Leaders' Council is a forum in the United Kingdom that brings together the Secretary of State for Housing, Communities and Local Government, other ministers in the UK government, and leaders of representative bodies of local government based in England.

== Purpose ==
The council aims to be a "regular forum for the key sector representatives to discuss strategic questions impacting local government, to share key and evolving challenges, and co-design solutions".

The English Devolution White Paper published on 16 December 2024 states that the council "… [brings] together a representative group of local authority leaders with the Deputy Prime Minister and other ministers so that local leaders have a seat at the table in government and policy solutions can be co-designed with local government."

== Members ==
Organisations represented on the council include the Local Government Association, Special Interest Group of Municipal Authorities, Core Cities Group, Key Cities, County Councils Network, District Councils' Network, and London Councils.

Most members of the council represent only local government in England. Although the Core Cities Group and Key Cities also cover other UK cities, the main local government representative bodies of Northern Ireland, Scotland and Wales are not represented on the council. The council's meetings in 2024 and 2025 are centred on child education, local government, housing and health in England and English devolution.

As of October 2024, the membership of the council is as follows:

Organisation	Geographical extent	Representative
Government of the United Kingdom	United Kingdom	Secretary of State for Housing, Communities and Local Government
Core Cities Group	United Kingdom	Chair
County Councils Network	England	Chair
District Councils' Network	England	Chair
Key Cities	England and Wales	Chair
Local Government Association	England	Chair
London Councils	Greater London	Chair
Special Interest Group of Municipal Authorities	England	Chair

== Meetings ==
The first meeting of the council took place in October 2024. The council meets up to four times a year.

Meetings of the Leaders' Council
Date	Location
24 October 2024	Harrogate
16 December 2024	London
4 March 2025	Chelmsford
21 July 2025	London

== See also ==
- Council of the Nations and Regions
- Mayoral Council for England
- National Economic Council (United Kingdom)
- Convention of Scottish Local Authorities
- Northern Ireland Local Government Association
- Welsh Local Government Association
- Local authority leaders' board
- Regional employers organisations
