= Prosper (organisation) =

Organization

- Formation: 1931
- Legal status: Non-profit organisation
- Purpose: Scottish Economic Development
- Location(s): Glasgow (headquarters) Aberdeen Inverness
- Region served: Scotland
- Members: 1,200 organisations
- President Chairman Chief Executive: Shonaig Macpherson CBE; Joanna Boag-Thomson; Sara Thiam
- Main organ: SCDI Board and Policy Committee
- Website: prosper.scot
- Formerly called: Scottish Council for Development and Industry (SCDI)

Prosper is a non-governmental, membership organisation which aims to strengthen Scotland's economic competitiveness through influencing government to create sustainable economic prosperity for Scotland. It was founded in 1931 as the Scottish Council for Development and Industry (SCDI).

SCDI had circa 1,200 members in 2012 across Scotland's private, public & social economy sectors, including manufacturing and service sectors, universities and colleges, local government and enterprise networks, trade associations and professional bodies, arts organisations, churches and trade unions.

In 2023 the organisation announced its new name, Prosper.

== Structure ==
Prosper's lead officers are the President, Chairman and Chief Executive

- President: Shonaig Macpherson CBE
- Chairman: Joanna Boag-Thomson
- Chief Executive: Sara Thiam

Prosper is led by the following Committees:

- Prosper Board – the strategic leadership for the organisation
- Prosper Policy Committee – the lead body for policy development

Prosper also has four regional committees, and an International Business Committee:

- Highlands and Islands Committee
- North East Committee
- London Committee
- South of Scotland Committee

Prosper policy is directed by its membership of leaders from across civic Scotland.

== Policy ==
=== Policy Overview ===
As a policy-focused organisation, Prosper's work revolves around the achievement of its policy objective – sustainable economic prosperity for Scotland.

Prosper's primary policy-making body is the Policy Committee which consists of representatives from across the private, public and social economy sectors which make up Prosper's membership.

The views of Prosper members are reflected in the development of Prosper's policy positions. Since its policy positions represent the consensus view of Prosper's diverse Scotland-wide membership, Prosper's policy output carries substantial weight. As a result, Prosper is well regarded contributor to political debate in Scotland and beyond.

With the publication in December 2015 of Prosper's key policy report From Fragile to Agile: A Blueprint for Growth & Prosperity, Prosper makes recommendations on how Scotland can become a better economy.

Prosper's policy priorities have focused on six key areas:

- Economy
- Energy and Sustainability
- Connectivity
- Skills and Productivity
- Global Ambitions
- Scotland's Future

Prosper produces a wide range of policy papers each year.

=== Blueprint for Scotland ===
Following membership consultation, Prosper launched its 'Blueprint for Scotland' in June 2010. This document was produced to influence the legislative agenda of the new Conservative-Liberal Democrat Coalition Government in Westminster and to feed into the development of political party manifestos in the run-up to the 2011 Scottish Parliamentary election.

The Blueprint presented a long-term vision for Scotland's future success under three headings:

- An outward and enterprising nation
- Maximising Scotland's assets
- Realising the potential of our people

A table of short term (5 year) and long term (10 year) priorities was presented in the Executive Summary to the Blueprint for Scotland:

==== Priorities ====
Short Term (5 years)	Long Term (10 years)
Broaden the business base of Scottish exporters and establish a network of Scottish Trade Centres	Double the value of Scotland's exports
Managed restoration of public finances to ensure public sector net debt falls as a share of GDP, but ensuring we support capital spending, R&D and skills	Return public spending growth to be in-line with the GDP growth trend in the long term
Restore the strength, reputation and competitiveness of Scotland's financial sector and its support for higher business investment and manufacturing	More balanced and sustainable growth across business sectors, with manufacturing a stable or growing share of GDP, and support for new world-class financial services headquartered in Scotland
Strengthen the Scottish Parliament’s responsibility for tax and spending decisions which promote sustainable economic growth. Increase the supply of skilled people for the Scottish economy	Increase sustainable economic growth and supply of skills

==== Maximising Scotland's Assets – Priorities ====
Short Term (5 years)	Long Term (10 years)
Begin construction of offshore wind, CCS, marine energy parks and new onshore and offshore grids, with Scottish supply chains	Meet 2020 renewable energy, climate change and green economy / ‘green-collar’ jobs targets. Transform every Scottish city into a low carbon city. Create low carbon zones around renewable power stations, CCS infrastructure and water resources to attract new industry to Scotland
Phase out supplementary corporation tax on the North Sea oil and gas industry	UK oil and gas to supply 60% of the UK demand for oil and 25% of its gas. Establish Aberdeen as the world's leading energy services hub
Support the market-led roll-out of high-speed broadband with public funding for the areas where the market will not deliver. Establish Scotland as a first-choice location for green data centres and build outsourcing excellence within Scotland supported by technology	Full wire Scotland to high-speed broadband, and transform business practices to achieve world-leading productivity growth performance. Create new ‘distributed cities’ in the Highlands and Islands and southern Scotland
Grow Scotland's international air route network, including direct flights to China and India	Commence construction of high-speed rail in Scotland

==== Realising the Potential of our People – Priorities ====
Short Term (5 years)	Long Term (10 years)
Independent review of university and college funding in Scotland to maintain international competitiveness	Focus more resources on centres of excellence
Refocus innovation schemes, create a single Office of Higher Education Technology Transfer and ring-fence 0.5% of the procurement budget to stimulate innovation across the economy	Increase business R&D to at least the UK average of 1.08% of GDP
Deliver a transformational skills syllabus and prioritise places in Science, Technology, Engineering and Mathematics (STEM) subjects	Maintain high employment levels and reduce economic inactivity, re/up-skill workforce and deliver skills for priority industries

== International Trade Visits ==
Since 1960, Prosper has worked to develop Scotland's international business links, organising a programme of global trade missions. By 2007, 5,000+ companies had participated in 350 trade missions abroad.

Prosper trade visits have supported companies to visit export markets, focusing on growth markets for Scottish exports across the World.

A large number of organisations joined our trade visits, ranging from sole traders, SMEs, large organisations, universities and colleges.

== SCDI Events ==
Prosper runs approximately 100 events each year involving senior business and civic leaders, politicians, and international thought leaders.

=== Flagship Events ===
- Prosper Forum – held annually in spring. This major conference event in the Scottish business calendar has gathered together key leaders and influencers from the Scottish, wider UK and international business and political spectrum to debate the future of the Scottish economy since 1970.
- Annual Lecture – held in Aberdeen in January each year with a high-profile economic leader giving the keynote address.
- Highlands and Islands Annual Dinner and Business Excellence Awards – recognising business excellence in the Highlands & Islands region each September.
- International Awards – Prosper has previously delivered a celebration of Scotland's international and exporting success. The 2010 International Awards Dinner was addressed by former Mayor of New York, Rudy Giuliani. In 2011, former Secretary-General of the United Nations, Kofi Annan gave the keynote address; and at the 2012 Awards Dinner at the Emirates Arena, Glasgow former US Secretary of State, Dr Madeleine Albright addressed a capacity business audience.
- London Series – a series of sessions in London related to Scottish interests, engaging businesses and politicians in London.

=== Other Events ===
An active events calendar is also delivered across the geography of Scotland throughout the year:

- Influencers' Series dinners programme
- Meet the Politician series
- Membership Networking events
- Election hustings
- Membership consultations
- Business Seminars & Conferences

== History ==
The Scottish Council for Development and Industry in its current form was created in 1946 by the amalgamation of two earlier bodies, the Scottish Development Council and the Scottish Council on Industry.

=== Scottish Development Council ===
The Scottish Development Council was established on 8 May 1931. At that time, Scotland was experiencing the worst effects of the depression, and the then-called Scottish National Development Council was created to analyse the courses of the collapse which had occurred and to find and apply solutions.

The leading figures involved in organising the first meeting were the Earl of Elgin, Sir Henry Keith (former Provost of Hamilton and Unionist MP) and William Watson of Glasgow (organiser of Scottish Trades Development Association). It was attended by representatives of the Burghs and Counties, Industry, Commerce and Banking, Trade Unions and prominent individuals. It was a response to a crucial, immediate situation, and this is stressed in the Constitution:

“It will be the duty of the Council to examine and consider impartially the industrial, commercial and economic problems with which the country is faced for the time being; to endeavour to arrive at a solution of these problems and where necessary, to obtain from Parliament such legislation as may be required to give effect to the conclusions reached by the Council”.

On 23 July 1931, Lord Elgin invited Sir James Lithgow to become Chairman of the Executive. This was a boost to the morale of the council and to its financial situation, as in December 1931, Lithgow donated £1,800 to the funds to meet the salary of the Secretary (W C Kirkwood) for three years. It was also at this time that the Scottish Development Council undertook to rent its first office in the premises of the Institution of Engineers and Shipbuilders, 39 Elmbank Street, Glasgow. Previous to this, meetings had been held in Lanarkshire House in Ingram Street and in the City Chambers of Glasgow and Edinburgh.

The first sub-committees were set up in December 1931 and the topics covered shows the area over which the Development Council hoped to spread its influence. Committees on Agriculture, Rating and Taxation, Textiles, Electrical developments, Chemical industries and the Fishing industry were formed.

An Economic Committee, Chaired by Sir Steven Bilsland was formed by the Council in collaboration with the Scottish Office in the early 1930s as an economic action group to explore and promote the new regional policies of the thirties. By 1938, it already had to its credit the establishment of the trading estate at Hillington.

=== The Scottish Council on Industry ===
The Scottish Council on Industry was created in 1942 on the initiative of the then Secretary of State for Scotland, Mr Tom Johnston. The wartime production requirements had been supplied by the creation of a new capacity in the South and the Midlands of England, while productive space in Scotland was increasingly devoted to storage uses. Mr Johnston set up the Council on Industry to give advice in relation to this and the other economic and industrial problems created by wartime conditions.

The council's composition consisted of four members each from the Convention of Royal Burghs, the Association of County Councils in Scotland, the Scottish Chambers of Commerce and the Scottish Trades Union Congress General Council, while banking interests were represented by one member only. The Scottish Development Council was represented by four members and its General Manager, W C Kirkwood, acted as a Joint Secretary to the Scottish Council on Industry.

In addition to the above, the Regional Offices of the Ministry of Labour and National Service, the Ministry of Works and Buildings, the Ministry of Aircraft Production, the Ministry of Supply, the Admiralty and the Factory and Storage Control attended meetings by invitation.

Some of the principal matters that engaged the attention of the Council on Industry were:

1. Ensuring that Scotland's productive capacity was fully used in the war effort.
2. Safeguarding Scotland's position in relation to the concentration of industry.
3. Transport difficulties as they affected Scotland.
4. Post war problems generally in relation to Scotland.
5. The provision of additional Industrial Estates and modern factories in Scotland.

The council also undertook investigations into Light Engineering, Plastics, Food Preservation and Fine Chemicals and appropriate firms were approached with a view to interesting them in new items to produce after the war.

The Council paid close attention to the future of Prestwick Airport, the Highlands and Islands, the Forth Road Bridge project and to the desire for the retention and if possible the expansion of the Admiralty Establishments in Scotland. It instigated Committees to investigate the White Fish Industry, the Crofter Woollen Industry, Transport and the Tourist Industry, among others. Like the Development Council the Council on Industry stressed the importance of export trade, the development of the chemical and electrical industries, research facilities and a publicity and travel Bureau for Scotland in London.

=== Merger ===
During the war the Scottish Development Council was seen as a part of the Scottish Council on Industry, although many of the members of the Development Council considered the Council on Industry as a temporary body that dealt with wartime issues. In 1945 the Council on Industry felt that it still had much to do in the post-war period and therefore wanted to expand its organisation, raising the funds for this from the Scottish public, particularly from the local authorities.

It was agreed by both bodies that it would be desirable, in order to avoid confusion and the possible overlapping of functions, that there should be a single authoritative body in Scotland to which the Secretary of State could look for advice and the general public for guidance and help, on questions of industry, employment and development. The then Secretary of State, Joseph Westwood, agreed with this and also endorsed that the reconstituted Scottish Council would be much enhanced if it could derive its revenue entirely from voluntary sources, thereby retaining freedom of action and effectiveness.

The merger had as its objectives the combination of the functions of the two original Councils. On the one hand, to continue to analyse the industrial situation, and to act in the light of that analysis so as to create more employment opportunities. On the other hand, to make representations to Government on matters affecting the progress of industry in Scotland.

The subject matter of the council's work has been industrial. In particular the council has participated in matters of policy and practice relating to technology, trade development, communications and the environment within which industry operates. This policy was made clear by the work of the Scottish Council right from the beginning.

=== Post-War ===
In the immediate post-war period, the Scottish Council was an agency in Scotland engaged in industrial promotion. In the course of the first year, panels and committees of the Council investigated many industries, including light and medium engineering, chemicals, building materials and plastics. Their aims were to increase utilisation of Scottish raw materials. In addition, a New Industries Panel was set up to consider which UK companies should be approached with a view to setting up a Scottish plant, “having in mind that the principal need in Scotland is for new industries which will employ men”.

They also set up committees to deal with public relations, export trade and tourism. The latter, a continuation of one set up in 1944 by the Scottish Council on Industry, under the Chairmanship of Dr Honeyman, highlighted the opportunity for the growth of tourism in Scotland and recommended that the Secretary of State for Scotland should create a suitable organisation to promote and co-ordinate growth in that area. The result was the appointment of the Scottish Tourist Board.

In 1939 there had appeared the "Industrial Map of Scotland", whose author C A Oakley, compiled an index, accompanied by maps, which listed the 2,500 manufacturing companies then employing 50 or more people in Scotland.

In 1947/48, the Scottish Council, knowing that electronic engineering capacity would be vital to the future of Scotland, was casting around for ways of establishing its presence. It worked in two ways:

In 1948, the Council embarked upon a planned campaign to attract companies from the United States. This was one of the first times a European country had adopted such a course, and the Council followed it up with the appointment of a committee in New York in 1949 to support the programme. The Netherlands followed a similar course in 1952.

At this period, American industry was ready to consider overseas investment, encouraged as it was by an international dollar shortage. Results followed swiftly with the arrival of NCR in 1947 (who doubled the size of their factory in 1952), Honeywell in 1949, and also IBM and Burroughs.

In this campaign, the council's object was not primarily to create employment. It was deliberately to fill the gaps in electronics, instrument and associated engineering in Scotland. The new plants were in the main associated with production and selling rather than with research and development, and the Council believed that a proportion would develop technological roots.

The second route to be followed was that of defence research and development, however, since, apart from Ferranti there was no research and development capacity in Scotland, few contracts came and there was no growth of capacity. To overcome this the Scottish Electronics Group was formed. Ferranti agreed to `mother’ the group and accept defence contracts which would be undertaken by Scottish companies interested in diversifying into electronics and light engineering. The Ministry of Supply agreed to channel some contracts on this basis, and to build a new laboratory for Ferranti Ltd as the centre of the scheme – a lab was opened by the Duke of Edinburgh in 1953.

From 1955 to 1982, the council's Films of Scotland Committee produced documentaries on Scotland. The Films of Scotland Committee collection is now part of the National Library of Scotland's Moving Image Archive.

In 1960–1961 John Toothill, general manager of Ferranti, led an Inquiry into the Scottish Economy, and in 1961 the Toothill Report was published, recommending new investment in the country's less prosperous areas.

== SCDI London ==
The London Committee first convened in 1932, one year after the SDC was formed. In the 1930s the London Committee was awarded £400 to publicise the Great Empire Exhibition in Bellahouston Park, Glasgow and a further £100 from Scottish Industrial Estates Ltd to promote interest in the newly opened Hillington Industrial Estate.

The London office and Committee were dissolved at the beginning of the Second World War but restarted life with a donation of £500 from the Scottish Tourist Board in 1948.

Throughout the years, the Council shared offices with the Scottish Tourist Board, the Scottish Development Agency, the New Towns Corporation and British Caledonian Airways.

The London Committee continues to play a role in Prosper's work, providing regular interface and debate with London-based members, national bodies and the Westminster Parliament.

== Young Engineers and Science Clubs ==
Since 1987, SCDI (now Prosper) has focused on the development of Young Engineers & Science Clubs throughout Scotland, hosted by schools and further education colleges.

The aim of the Clubs is to involve young people in science, technology, engineering and maths, by encouraging them to use their creative and innovative skills supported by appropriate local companies. Clubs adopt a hands-on approach to projects in science; electrical, electronic, mechanical, robotics and civil engineering; and a wide range of technology applications.

Over 1,400 Young Engineers & Science Clubs now operate across all 32 local authority areas in Scotland with a membership of circa 30,000 Primary and Secondary school pupils.

=== Celebration of Engineering and Science ===
In June each year, Young Engineers and Science Clubs from across Scotland gather in Glasgow for a STEM Celebration of engineering and science.

More than 500 school pupils demonstrate their project work throughout the year and participate in a series of hands-on Technology Challenges, competing to win the Best Young Engineers Club trophy.

== New name is Prosper ==
In October 2023, SDCI decided to relaunch itself under the new name of Prosper with notables invited to its launch. VIPs present included the then Scottish First Minister Humza Yousaf, COSLA President Shona Morrison, RBS chair Judith Cruickshank, General Secretary of the Scottish Trades Union Congress Roz Foyer and the Prosper CEO Sara Thiam and the Prosper chair Joanna Boag-Thomson.

== See also ==
- Economy of Scotland
