= County Councils Network =

UK special interest group

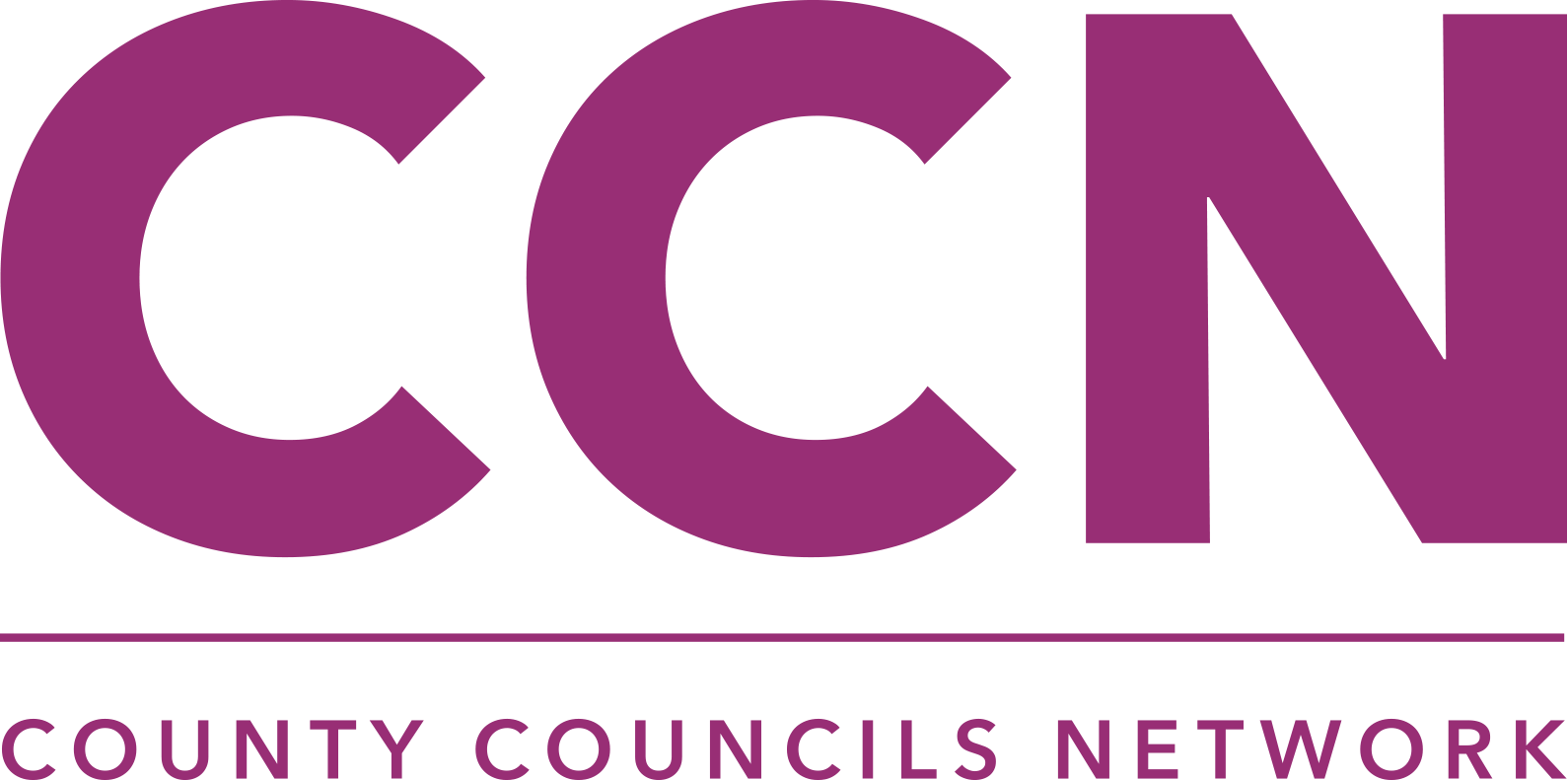
- Logo
- Type: Special interest group
- Region served: United Kingdom
- Members: 38; 20 county councils 18 unitary authorities
- Chair: Tim Oliver

The County Councils Network is a special interest group within the Local Government Association. Its 38 members are 20 English county councils and 18 unitary authority councils. The network is the national voice for counties, and has released a significant report containing ambitious policy proposals on behalf of county councils and unitary councils in England.

More recently, the CCN has released influential research outlining the funding challenges facing local government, alongside original research on planning, social mobility, and levelling up.

The County Councils Network works on a cross-party basis, with members of its management committee drawn from all three major parties. The current Chairman of the County Councils Network is Cllr Tim Oliver, leader of Surrey County Council. It campaigns on funding inequalities for counties, issues surrounding social care and children's services, and on devolution to rural areas, as well as other local government-related topics. The County Councils Network shares offices with the Local Government Association in Westminster.

The County Councils Network is represented on the Local Government Leaders' Council by its chair.

== List of members ==
County councils

- Cambridgeshire County Council
- Derbyshire County Council
- Devon County Council
- East Sussex County Council
- Essex County Council
- Gloucestershire County Council
- Hampshire County Council
- Hertfordshire County Council
- Kent County Council
- Lancashire County Council
- Lincolnshire County Council
- Norfolk County Council
- Nottinghamshire County Council
- Oxfordshire County Council
- Staffordshire County Council
- Suffolk County Council
- Surrey County Council
- Warwickshire County Council
- West Sussex County Council
- Worcestershire County Council

Unitary authorities

- Buckinghamshire Council
- Central Bedfordshire Council
- Cheshire East Council
- Cornwall Council
- Cumberland Council
- Dorset Council
- Durham County Council
- East Riding of Yorkshire
- Herefordshire Council
- Northumberland County Council
- North Lincolnshire Council
- North Northamptonshire Council
- North Yorkshire Council
- Shropshire Council
- Somerset Council
- Westmorland and Furness Council
- West Northamptonshire Council
- Wiltshire Council
