= Sean Morton =

Scottish politician (born 1981 or 1982)

Moray Councillor for Fochabers Lhanbryde
- In office 2012–2017

Personal details
- Born: 1981 or 1982 (age 44–45)

Sean Morton (born 1981 or 1982) is a Scottish former politician who served as a Labour councillor for Fochabers Lhanbryde in Moray from 2012 to 2017. He was the Labour candidate for Moray in the 2015 United Kingdom general election. He was convicted in 2018 of possessing indecent images of children and extreme pornography, and received a community payback order. He was convicted again in 2025 for further similar offences and breaching a sexual offences prevention order, resulting in a 16-month prison sentence.

== Early life and education ==
Sean Morton was born 1981 or 1982. He attended Milne's High School in Fochabers, where he met future Labour MSP Pam Duncan-Glancy. He studied international politics and modern languages at the University of Stirling. After university, he worked as a parliamentary researcher.

== Political career ==
Morton was elected as a Labour councillor for the Fochabers Lhanbryde ward in the 2012 Moray Council election. In December 2016, he called the newly installed Dandy Lion statue in Elgin "cultural and intellectual vomit in technicolor". He served one term, before unsuccessfully restanding as an independent in 2017.

In the 2015 UK general election, he stood as the Labour candidate for Moray but was unsuccessful, finishing third of six candidates with 9.9% of the vote.

In December 2016, Morton was charged with offences related to indecent images of children, leading to his suspension from the Labour Party in January 2017. He resigned from the party and ran as an independent candidate in the May 2017 local elections but was not re-elected. During his independent campaign, he received support from Labour figures including Matthew Doyle (later Lord Doyle) and Pam Duncan-Glancy.

== Sex offences ==
Morton was reported to police by a new acquaintance on 7 June 2016 and arrested at home three days later. Morton first appeared in court on 24 December 2016 at Elgin Sheriff Court, charged under the Civic Government (Scotland) Act 1982 in connection with indecent images of children. Images of four girls aged 10–15 dated November 2013 were found on his MacBook, and images of people having sex with a dog were found in his iTunes account. In November 2017, he admitted to possessing indecent images of children and extreme pornography. His lawyer argued in mitigation that Morton had been sexually abused as a child. On 20 February 2018, he was sentenced to a community payback order requiring 140 hours of unpaid work, a three-year supervision order, and placement on the sex offenders register.

In 2024, Morton breached his sexual offences prevention order. He was also found to possess further indecent photographs of children. In January 2025, at Glasgow Sheriff Court, he was sentenced to 16 months in prison, with the sentence backdated to May 2024.

The disclosures about Morton's convictions, along with his ongoing ties to Doyle and Duncan-Glancy, led to both of them being suspended by the party in February 2026.

== Electoral history ==
Fochabers Lhanbryde, 2012 – 3 seats
Party	Candidate	FPv%	Count			
Party	Candidate	FPv%	1	2	3	4
Conservative	Douglas Ross (incumbent)	39.5%	1,318			
SNP	Margo Howe	21.82%	728	768.7	810.2	1,335
SNP	Anita McDonald (incumbent)	18.34%	612	676.1	708.2	
Labour	Sean Morton	15.34%	512	583.5	714.7	793.9
Liberal Democrats	Peter Horton	5.0%	167	304.1		
Electorate: 7,717 Valid: 3,337 Spoilt: 28 Quota: 835 Turnout: 3,365 (43.24%)

General election 2015: Moray
Party	Candidate	Votes	%	±%
SNP	Angus Robertson	24,384	49.5	+9.8
Conservative	Douglas Ross	15,319	31.1	+5.0
Labour	Sean Morton	4,898	9.9	−7.2
UKIP	Robert Scorer	1,939	3.9	+1.3
Liberal Democrats	Jamie Paterson	1,395	2.8	−11.7
Green	James MacKessack-Leitch	1,345	2.7	New
Majority		9,065	18.4	+4.8
Turnout		49,280	68.7	+6.5
SNP hold		Swing	+2.4	

Fochabers Lhanbryde, 2017 – 3 seats
Party	Candidate	FPv%	Count						
Party	Candidate	FPv%	1	2	3	4	5	6	7
Conservative	Marc Macrae	42.7	1,747						
SNP	Shona Morrison	16.7	682	702	708	738	759	794	872
SNP	David Bremner	17.4	711	722	729	752	760	792	862
Independent	Ian Taylor	6.7	274	361	374	441	578	701	
Liberal Democrats	Donald Cameron	5.2	211	318	394	445	511		
Independent	Kenneth Gillespie	4.1	166	282	294	344			
Independent	Sean Morton (incumbent)	5.3	215	284	289				
Liberal Democrats	Peter Horton	2.0	83	142					
Electorate: 8,089 Valid: 4,089 Spoilt: 71 Quota: 1,023 Turnout: 51.4%
