= Local Councils Network =

- Predecessor: Association of District Councils
- Formation: April 1974
- Type: Special interest group
- Purpose: To "act as an informed and representative advocate for districts to government and other national bodies, based on their unique position to deliver for 'local' people".
- Headquarters: Westminster, London
- Region served: United Kingdom
- Members: 164
- Chairman: Councillor Sam Chapman-Allen
- Website: districtcouncils.info

The Local Councils Network (LCN), previously known as the District Councils' Network (DCN), is a special interest group in the Local Government Association. It represents 164 non-metropolitan district councils in England, representing over 40% of the population and 68% of the land. It is funded by membership subscriptions and its purpose is to "act as an informed and representative advocate for districts to government and other national bodies, based on their unique position to deliver for 'local' people".

It shares offices with the Local Government Association in Westminster.

== History ==
District Councils were created in 1974 following the restructure of local government in England. District Councils were created alongside County Councils and are responsible for running services such as housing, economic development, waste collection, planning and community services.

Following the re-organisation of local government the Association of District Councils (ADC) was set up in April 1974. This replaced the Rural District Councils Association and Urban District Councils Association as the representative body of non-metropolitan district councils in England. In March 1997, the ADC was wound up and merged with other local authority organisations to form the Local Government Association (LGA).

The District Councils' Network was formed as a special interest group of the LGA to give a distinct voice for District Councils. In 2011, the DCN inherited funds from the defunct ADC.

== Members' Board and Chief Executives' Group ==
The DCN has a Members' Board consisting of 22 councillors representing the Conservative, Labour, Liberal Democrats and independent groups from all areas of the country. As of 2021 this is chaired by Cllr Sam Chapman-Allen, Leader of Breckland.

Alongside the DCN Members' Board sits the Chief Executives' Group (CEG) made up of District Chief Executives from across the country. The chair of the CEG is Trevor Holden, Chief Executive at South Norfolk and Broadland District Councils.

The Director of the DCN is James Hood.

The DCN Assembly meets four times a year including an annual DCN Conference; previous keynote speakers include Rishi Sunak, Local Government Finance Minister, Liz Truss, Chief Secretary to the Treasury, James Brokenshire, Secretary of State for Housing, Communities and Local Government and Greg Clark, Secretary of State for Business, Energy and Industrial Strategy.

== About ==
The DCN provides a voice for district councils to the Local Government Association, Central Government and other national bodies. This work includes informing and influencing national and local stakeholders. The DCN has worked on a variety of issues; including local government finance, welfare reform, planning, housing, economic regeneration and health and wellbeing.

The DCN has released a number of publications on issues affecting district councils in England. In 2015 the DCN commissioned renowned health think-tank The Kings Fund to explore the scope for districts playing a greater preventative role in the public health agenda in a groundbreaking study 'A time of challenge and opportunity' and academics from the University of Birmingham's Inlogov to investigate the best way districts should adapt to the English devolution agenda in a report entitled 'Building Better Collaboration'.

Previous publications have included a joint research project with the independent think tank New Local Government Network on new ways of working; a publication on District Councils involvement in City Deals, and Districts actions on the Public Health agenda. The DCN also provide evidence on behalf of District Councils to central government to help shape the direction of policy towards local government. This has included evidence on Community Budgets, Local Enterprise Partnerships, Localisation of Council Tax, Business Rates, Public Health, Welfare Reform and Private Rented Sector Housing. The DCN also host a number of events each year on topics affecting District Councils such as public health and private sector housing.

The District Councils Network is represented on the Local Government Leaders' Council by its chair.

== Chairs of the DCN ==
- Gary Porter, Lord Porter of Spalding (2009–2014)
- Neil Clarke MBE, Rushcliffe Borough Council, (2014 - 2017)
- John Fuller OBE, Leader South Norfolk Council, (2017-2021)
- Sam Chapman-Allen, Leader Breckland Council, (2021- Present)

== List of counties and districts ==
This is a list of non-metropolitan counties and their districts in membership of the District Councils' Network.

Non-metropolitan county	Non-metropolitan districts (excluding unitary authorities)	Number
Cambridgeshire	Cambridge - South Cambridgeshire - Huntingdonshire - Fenland - East Cambridgeshire	5
Derbyshire	High Peak - Derbyshire Dales - South Derbyshire - Erewash - Amber Valley - North East Derbyshire - Chesterfield - Bolsover	8
Devon	Exeter - East Devon - Mid Devon - North Devon - Torridge - West Devon - South Hams - Teignbridge	8
East Sussex	Hastings - Rother - Wealden - Eastbourne - Lewes	5
Essex	Harlow - Epping Forest - Brentwood - Basildon - Castle Point - Rochford - Maldon - Chelmsford - Uttlesford - Braintree - Colchester - Tendring	12
Gloucestershire	Gloucester - Tewkesbury - Cheltenham - Cotswold - Stroud - Forest of Dean	6
Hampshire	Fareham - Winchester - Havant - East Hampshire - Hart - Rushmoor - Basingstoke and Deane - Test Valley - Eastleigh - New Forest	10
Hertfordshire	Three Rivers - Watford - Hertsmere - Welwyn Hatfield - Broxbourne - East Hertfordshire - Stevenage - North Hertfordshire - St Albans - Dacorum	10
Kent	Dartford - Gravesham - Sevenoaks - Tonbridge and Malling - Tunbridge Wells - Maidstone - Swale - Ashford - Folkestone and Hythe - Canterbury - Dover - Thanet	12
Lancashire	West Lancashire - Chorley - Fylde - Preston - Wyre - Lancaster - Ribble Valley - Pendle - Burnley - Rossendale - Hyndburn - South Ribble	12
Leicestershire	Charnwood - Melton - Harborough - Oadby and Wigston - Blaby - Hinckley and Bosworth - North West Leicestershire	7
Lincolnshire	Lincoln - North Kesteven - South Kesteven - South Holland - Boston - East Lindsey - West Lindsey	7
Norfolk	Norwich - South Norfolk - Great Yarmouth - Broadland - North Norfolk - King's Lynn and West Norfolk - Breckland	7
Nottinghamshire	Rushcliffe - Broxtowe - Ashfield - Gedling - Newark and Sherwood - Mansfield - Bassetlaw	7
Oxfordshire	Oxford - Cherwell - South Oxfordshire - Vale of White Horse - West Oxfordshire	5
Staffordshire	Tamworth - Lichfield - Cannock Chase - South Staffordshire - Stafford - Newcastle-under-Lyme - Staffordshire Moorlands - East Staffordshire	8
Suffolk	Ipswich - East Suffolk - Mid Suffolk - Babergh - West Suffolk	5
Surrey	Spelthorne - Runnymede - Surrey Heath - Woking - Elmbridge - Guildford - Waverley - Mole Valley - Epsom and Ewell - Reigate and Banstead - Tandridge	11
Warwickshire	North Warwickshire - Nuneaton and Bedworth - Rugby - Stratford-on-Avon - Warwick	5
West Sussex	Worthing - Arun - Chichester - Horsham - Crawley - Mid Sussex - Adur	7
Worcestershire	Worcester - Malvern Hills - Wyre Forest - Bromsgrove - Redditch - Wychavon	6
Total		191

== See also ==
- Local government in England
- History of local government in England
- Local government in the United Kingdom
- Political make-up of local councils in the United Kingdom#District councils
- Local Government Association
