= Non-metropolitan district =

Type of local government district in England

- Also known as: Shire district
- Category: Local authority districts
- Location: England
- Found in: Non-metropolitan county
- Created by: Local Government Act 1972
- Created: 1 April 1974
- Number: 226 (as of 2023)
- Possible types: Two-tier (164); Unitary authority (62)
- Possible status: City; Royal borough; Borough

Non-metropolitan districts, or colloquially "shire districts", are a type of local government district in England. As created, they were all sub-divisions of non-metropolitan counties (colloquially shire counties) in a two-tier arrangement. Some non-metropolitan districts have had their functions merged with a non-metropolitan county to form a single tier of local government, in which case they are generally referred to as unitary authorities.

Non-metropolitan districts with borough status are known as boroughs, able to appoint a mayor. Some shire counties, for example Cornwall, now have no sub-divisions so are a single non-metropolitan district.

Typically, a district will consist of a market town and its more rural hinterland. However, districts are diverse, with some being mostly urban (such as Dartford) and others more polycentric (such as Thurrock).

== Structure ==
Non-metropolitan districts are subdivisions of English non-metropolitan counties which have a two-tier structure of local government. Two-tier non-metropolitan counties have a county council and several districts, each with a borough or district council. In these cases local government functions are divided between county and district councils, to the level where they can be practised most efficiently:

- Borough/district councils are responsible for local planning and building control, council housing, environmental health, markets and fairs, refuse collection and recycling, cemeteries and crematoria, leisure services, parks, and tourism.
- County councils are responsible for running the largest and most expensive local services such as education, social services, libraries, main roads, public transport, fire services, Trading Standards, waste disposal and strategic planning.
- In the case where a non-metropolitan county consists of a single non-metropolitan district, there is a single council, a unitary authority, that is responsible for all functions.

Service	Two-tier		Unitary authority
Service	Non-metropolitan county	Non-metropolitan district	Unitary authority
Education	Yes	No	Yes
Transport	Yes	No	Yes
Housing	No	Yes	Yes
Planning	Yes (Note: Planning authority for minerals, waste and county council developments)	Yes	Yes
Planning applications	No	Yes	Yes
Fire and public safety	Yes	No	Yes
Social care	Yes	No	Yes
Libraries	Yes	No	Yes
Waste management	Yes	No	Yes
Rubbish collection	No	Yes	Yes
Recycling	No	Yes	Yes
Trading standards	Yes	No	Yes
Council Tax collections	No	Yes	Yes

== Status ==
Many districts have borough status, which means the local council is called a borough council instead of district council and gives them the right to appoint a mayor. Borough status is granted by royal charter and, in many cases, continues a style enjoyed by a predecessor authority, which can date back centuries. Some districts such as Oxford or Exeter have city status, granted by letters patent, but this does not give the local council any extra powers other than the right to call itself a city council.

== History ==
By 1899, England had been divided at district level into rural districts, urban districts, municipal boroughs, county boroughs and metropolitan boroughs. This system was abolished by the London Government Act 1963 and the Local Government Act 1972. Non-metropolitan districts were created by this act in 1974 when England outside Greater London was divided into metropolitan counties and non-metropolitan counties. Metropolitan counties were sub-divided into metropolitan districts and the non-metropolitan counties were sub-divided into non-metropolitan districts. The metropolitan districts had more powers than their non-metropolitan counterparts. Initially, there were 296 non-metropolitan districts in the two-tier structure, but reforms in the 1990s and 2009 reduced their number to 192. A further 55 non-metropolitan districts are now unitary authorities, which combine the functions of county and borough/district councils.

=== Scotland and Wales ===
In Wales, an almost identical two-tier system of local government existed between 1974 and 1996 (see Districts of Wales). In 1996, this was abolished and replaced with an entirely unitary system of local government, with one level of local government responsible for all local services. Since the areas for Wales and England had been enacted separately and there were no Welsh metropolitan areas, the term 'non-metropolitan district' does not apply to Wales. A similar system existed in Scotland, which in 1975 was divided into regions and districts, this was also abolished in 1996 and replaced with a fully unitary system.

== District Councils' Network ==
In England most of the district councils are represented by the District Councils' Network, special interest group which sits within the Local Government Association. The network's purpose is to "act as an informed and representative advocate for districts to government and other national bodies, based on their unique position to deliver for local people."

== List of non-metropolitan districts ==
=== Unitary ===
This is a list of unitary authority non-metropolitan districts, which, with the exception of those of Berkshire, are coterminous with non-metropolitan counties.

District	Region	Land area		Population (2024)	Density	
District	Region	(km^{2})	(mi^{2})	Population (2024)	(/km^{2})	(/mi^{2})
Bath and North East Somerset	South West	346	134	200,028	578	1,500
Bedford	East	476	184	194,976	409	1,060
Blackburn with Darwen	North West	137	53	162,540	1,186	3,070
Blackpool	North West	35	14	144,191	4,135	10,710
Bournemouth, Christchurch and Poole	South West	162	63	408,967	2,523	6,530
Bracknell Forest	South East	109	42	130,806	1,196	3,100
Brighton & Hove	South East	83	32	283,870	3,427	8,880
Bristol	South West	110	42	494,399	4,508	11,680
Buckinghamshire	South East	1,565	604	578,772	370	960
Central Bedfordshire	East	716	276	315,877	441	1,140
Cheshire East	North West	1,166	450	421,298	361	930
Cheshire West and Chester	North West	920	360	371,652	404	1,050
Cornwall	South West	3,545	1,369	583,289	165	430
County Durham	North East	2,226	859	538,011	242	630
Cumberland	North West	3,012	1,163	280,495	93	240
Darlington	North East	197	76	112,489	570	1,500
Derby	East Midlands	78	30	274,149	3,514	9,100
Dorset	South West	2,491	962	389,947	157	410
East Riding of Yorkshire	Yorkshire and the Humber	2,404	928	355,884	148	380
Halton	North West	79	31	131,543	1,663	4,310
Hartlepool	North East	94	36	98,180	1,048	2,710
Herefordshire	West Midlands	2,180	840	191,047	88	230
Isle of Wight	South East	380	150	141,660	373	970
Kingston upon Hull	Yorkshire and the Humber	72	28	275,401	3,848	9,970
Leicester	East Midlands	73	28	388,348	5,295	13,710
Luton	East	43	17	239,090	5,515	14,280
Medway	South East	194	75	292,655	1,511	3,910
Middlesbrough	North East	54	21	156,161	2,898	7,510
Milton Keynes	South East	309	119	305,884	991	2,570
North East Lincolnshire	Yorkshire and the Humber	193	75	159,911	830	2,100
North Lincolnshire	Yorkshire and the Humber	847	327	171,336	202	520
North Northamptonshire	East Midlands	987	381	373,871	379	980
North Somerset	South West	374	144	224,578	601	1,560
North Yorkshire	Yorkshire and the Humber	8,037	3,103	635,270	79	200
Northumberland	North East	5,020	1,940	331,420	66	170
Nottingham	East Midlands	75	29	331,077	4,437	11,490
Peterborough	East	343	132	223,655	651	1,690
Plymouth	South West	80	31	272,067	3,407	8,820
Portsmouth	South East	40	15	214,321	5,307	13,750
Reading	South East	40	15	182,907	4,528	11,730
Redcar and Cleveland	North East	245	95	139,228	568	1,470
Rutland	East Midlands	382	147	41,443	109	280
Shropshire	West Midlands	3,197	1,234	332,455	104	270
Slough	South East	33	13	167,359	5,143	13,320
Somerset	South West	3,450	1,330	588,328	171	440
South Gloucestershire	South West	497	192	306,332	616	1,600
Southampton	South East	50	19	259,424	5,201	13,470
Southend-on-Sea	East	42	16	185,256	4,445	11,510
Stockton-on-Tees	North East	205	79	206,800	1,009	2,610
Stoke-on-Trent	West Midlands	93	36	270,425	2,894	7,500
Swindon	South West	230	89	243,875	1,060	2,700
Telford and Wrekin	West Midlands	290	110	195,952	675	1,750
Thurrock	East	164	63	180,989	1,105	2,860
Torbay	South West	63	24	140,126	2,228	5,770
Warrington	North West	181	70	215,391	1,192	3,090
West Berkshire	South East	704	272	165,112	234	610
West Northamptonshire	East Midlands	1,377	532	439,811	319	830
Westmorland and Furness	North West	3,756	1,450	230,185	61	160
Wiltshire	South West	3,255	1,257	523,700	161	420
Windsor and Maidenhead	South East	196	76	158,943	809	2,100
Wokingham	South East	179	69	187,200	1,046	2,710
York	Yorkshire and the Humber	272	105	209,301	770	2,000

=== Two-tier ===
This is a list of two-tier non-metropolitan counties and their districts.

Non-metropolitan counties and their districts (excluding unitary authorities)
Non-metropolitan county	Non-metropolitan districts	Number
Cambridgeshire	Cambridge – South Cambridgeshire – Huntingdonshire – Fenland – East Cambridgeshire	5
Derbyshire	High Peak – Derbyshire Dales – South Derbyshire – Erewash – Amber Valley – North East Derbyshire – Chesterfield – Bolsover	8
Devon	Exeter – East Devon – Mid Devon – North Devon – Torridge – West Devon – South Hams – Teignbridge	8
East Sussex	Hastings – Rother – Wealden – Eastbourne – Lewes	5
Essex	Harlow – Epping Forest – Brentwood – Basildon – Castle Point – Rochford – Maldon – Chelmsford – Uttlesford – Braintree – Colchester – Tendring	12
Gloucestershire	Gloucester – Tewkesbury – Cheltenham – Cotswold – Stroud – Forest of Dean	6
Hampshire	Gosport – Fareham – Winchester – Havant – East Hampshire – Hart – Rushmoor – Basingstoke and Deane – Test Valley – Eastleigh – New Forest	11
Hertfordshire	Three Rivers – Watford – Hertsmere – Welwyn Hatfield – Broxbourne – East Hertfordshire – Stevenage – North Hertfordshire – St Albans – Dacorum	10
Kent	Dartford – Gravesham – Sevenoaks – Tonbridge and Malling – Tunbridge Wells – Maidstone – Swale – Ashford – Folkestone and Hythe – Canterbury – Dover – Thanet	12
Lancashire	West Lancashire – Chorley – South Ribble – Fylde – Preston – Wyre – Lancaster – Ribble Valley – Pendle – Burnley – Rossendale – Hyndburn	12
Leicestershire	Charnwood – Melton – Harborough – Oadby and Wigston – Blaby – Hinckley and Bosworth – North West Leicestershire	7
Lincolnshire	Lincoln – North Kesteven – South Kesteven – South Holland – Boston – East Lindsey – West Lindsey	7
Norfolk	Norwich – South Norfolk – Great Yarmouth – Broadland – North Norfolk – King's Lynn and West Norfolk – Breckland	7
Nottinghamshire	Rushcliffe – Broxtowe – Ashfield – Gedling – Newark and Sherwood – Mansfield – Bassetlaw	7
Oxfordshire	Oxford – Cherwell – South Oxfordshire – Vale of White Horse – West Oxfordshire	5
Staffordshire	Tamworth – Lichfield – Cannock Chase – South Staffordshire – Stafford – Newcastle-under-Lyme – Staffordshire Moorlands – East Staffordshire	8
Suffolk	Ipswich – Babergh – East Suffolk – Mid Suffolk – West Suffolk	5
Surrey	Spelthorne – Runnymede – Surrey Heath – Woking – Elmbridge – Guildford – Waverley – Mole Valley – Epsom and Ewell – Reigate and Banstead – Tandridge	11
Warwickshire	North Warwickshire – Nuneaton and Bedworth – Rugby – Stratford-on-Avon – Warwick	5
West Sussex	Worthing – Arun – Chichester – Horsham – Crawley – Mid Sussex – Adur	7
Worcestershire	Worcester – Malvern Hills – Wyre Forest – Bromsgrove – Redditch – Wychavon	6
Total		164

== List of abolished non-metropolitan districts ==
This is a list of former two-tier districts in England which have been abolished, by local government reorganisations such as the 2009 structural changes to local government in England. It does not include districts that still exist after becoming a unitary authority or those that transferred from one county to another, including those that changed name. Nor does it include unitary authorities that have been abolished (Bournemouth and Poole).

Non-metropolitan county (at time of abolition)	Abolished two-tier non-metropolitan districts	Number
Avon	Bath – Kingswood – Northavon – Wansdyke	4
Bedfordshire	Mid Bedfordshire – South Bedfordshire	2
Buckinghamshire	South Bucks – Chiltern – Wycombe – Aylesbury Vale	4
Cheshire	Chester – Congleton – Crewe and Nantwich – Ellesmere Port and Neston – Macclesfield – Vale Royal	6
Cornwall	Caradon – Carrick – Kerrier – North Cornwall – Penwith – Restormel	6
Cumbria	Barrow-in-Furness – South Lakeland – Copeland – Allerdale – Eden – Carlisle	6
Dorset	Weymouth and Portland – West Dorset – North Dorset – Purbeck – East Dorset – Christchurch	6
Durham	Durham – Easington – Sedgefield – Chester-le-Street – Derwentside – Wear Valley – Teesdale	7
East Sussex	Brighton – Hove	2
Hereford and Worcester	Hereford – Leominster – Malvern Hills – South Herefordshire	3
Humberside	East Yorkshire Borough of Beverley – Boothferry – Cleethorpes – East Yorkshire – Glanford – Great Grimsby – Holderness – Scunthorpe	8
Isle of Wight	Medina – South Wight	2
Kent	Gillingham – Rochester-upon-Medway	2
Northamptonshire	South Northamptonshire – Northampton – Daventry – Wellingborough – Kettering – Corby – East Northamptonshire	7
North Yorkshire	York (Note: the district was abolished in 1996 and merged to form a larger York unitary district) – Selby – Harrogate – Craven – Richmondshire – Hambleton – Ryedale – Scarborough	8
Northumberland	Blyth Valley – Wansbeck – Castle Morpeth – Tynedale – Alnwick – Berwick-upon-Tweed	6
Shropshire	Bridgnorth – North Shropshire – Oswestry – Shrewsbury and Atcham – South Shropshire	5
Somerset	Taunton Deane – West Somerset – South Somerset – Somerset West and Taunton – Sedgemoor – Mendip	6
Suffolk	Forest Heath – St Edmundsbury – Suffolk Coastal – Waveney	4
Wiltshire	Kennet – North Wiltshire – Salisbury – West Wiltshire	4
Total		98

== See also ==
- List of local governments in the United Kingdom
- District Councils' Network
- 2019–2023 structural changes to local government in England
