= Public Sector Audit Appointments =

Public Sector Audit Appointments Ltd.
- Industry: Public Sector Financial Auditing
- Founded: August 2014; 10 years ago
- Founder: Local Government Association
- Headquarters: United Kingdom

Public Sector Audit Appointments Ltd. (PSAA) is a UK company limited by guarantee established by the Local Government Association in August 2014. The Secretary of State for Communities and Local Government has delegated statutory functions (from the Audit Commission Act 1998) to the PSAA on a transitional basis by way of a letter of delegation issued under powers contained in the Local Audit and Accountability Act 2014.

Under these transitional arrangements, the company is responsible for appointing auditors to local government, police, and local NHS bodies, setting audit fees, and making arrangements for the certification of housing benefit subsidy claims. These transitional arrangements ended for local NHS bodies and smaller authorities from 2017/18, and PSAA will no longer be responsible for appointing their auditors, but the arrangements have been extended by one year for local government and police bodies, so PSAA will continue to be responsible for appointing their auditors for the audits of their accounts for the year 2017/18.

Some staff of the former Audit Commission transferred to the new company to ensure continuity.

In July 2016, the Secretary of State for Communities and Local Government specified PSAA as an "appointing person" under regulation 3 of the Local Audit (Appointing Person) Regulations 2015. This means that PSAA can make auditor appointments for audits of the accounts of principal authorities from 2018/19 onwards where they choose to opt into its arrangements. Such appointments must be made by 31 December 2017. PSAA will manage audit procurement and appointment on behalf of principal authorities who choose to make use of these arrangements, contracting with audit firms with "a proven track record in undertaking public audit work".
