= Pam Duncan-Glancy =

Scottish Labour politician

Pam Duncan-Glancy MBE
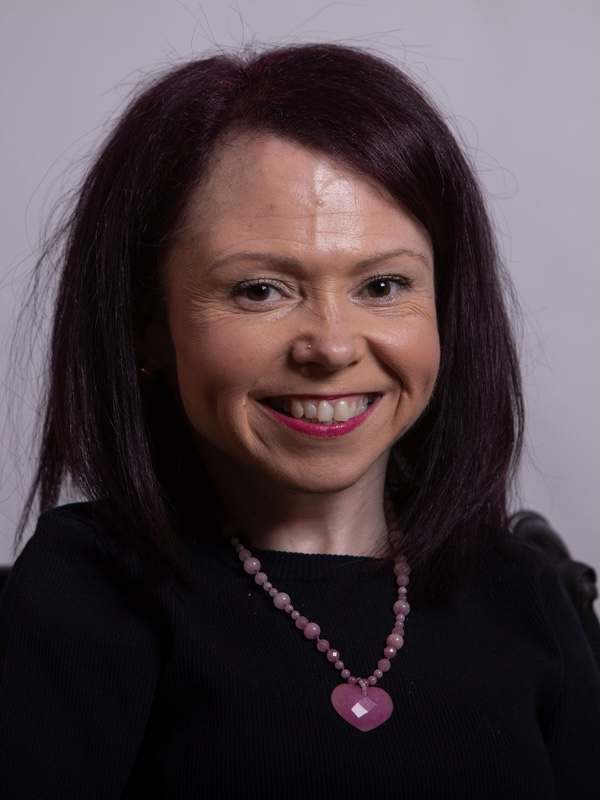
- Official portrait, 2021

Member of the Scottish Parliament for Glasgow (1 of 7 Regional MSPs)
- In office 6 May 2021 – 9 April 2026

Scottish Labour portfolios
- 2021–2023: Shadow Cabinet Secretary for Social Security
- 2023–2025: Shadow Cabinet Secretary for Education and Skills

Personal details
- Born: 2 November 1981 (age 44)
- Party: Independent (2026–); Scottish Labour (until 2026) (Note: Whip suspended from 10 February 2026)
- Education: University of Stirling; Glasgow Caledonian University
- Website: www.GlasgowPam.scot

Pam Duncan-Glancy MBE (born 2 November 1981) is a Scottish independent politician. Formerly a member of Scottish Labour she was a Member of the Scottish Parliament (MSP) for the Glasgow region from May 2021. She is the first permanent wheelchair user elected to the Scottish Parliament.

== Early life and career ==
Duncan-Glancy was diagnosed as having juvenile idiopathic arthritis at 18-months-old. She has a BSc in Psychology and an MSc in Health Psychology from the University of Stirling, and a Postgraduate certificate in Citizenship and Human Rights from Glasgow Caledonian University. She sat on the Commission on Strengthening Local Democracy and on the Commission on Parliamentary Reform. Prior to her election, she worked in public health communications for NHS Health Scotland.

== Political career ==
Duncan-Glancy contested Glasgow North for the general elections in 2017 and 2019, but came second to Patrick Grady, the incumbent SNP MP. She received a 34.5% share of the vote in 2017 and a 31.4% share in 2019.

On 1 March 2021, despite not being a parliamentarian at the time, she became Scottish Labour's spokesperson for Social Security in the Scottish Parliament.

After being a Labour member for approximately twenty years, Duncan-Glancy became a Member of Scottish Parliament (MSP) in 2021. Duncan-Glancy stood in Glasgow Kelvin in 2021 and came third to SNP candidate Kaukab Stewart, but was elected on the Glasgow regional list on 8 May 2021. She was selected for the seat following the previous candidate's deselection for comments suggesting she "respected the right" for Scotland to have another independence referendum. Eleven members of the Kelvin Labour executive committee resigned in protest and refused to campaign for Duncan-Glancy.

During the election count, Duncan-Glancy received significant coverage as she highlighted the issues disabled candidates face when she was denied access to the Glasgow vote count due to the venue's lack of accessibility.

Duncan-Glancy backed the UK Government’s decision to introduce means-testing for the Winter Fuel Payment, voting in the Scottish Parliament against calls to reverse the decision.

=== Friendship with Sean Morton ===
On 5 December 2025 Duncan-Glancy resigned as Scottish Labour's spokesperson for Education and Skills after it was revealed that she had continued to maintain a close personal friendship with Sean Morton, a former Labour councillor who had pleaded guilty to possessing indecent images of children in 2017. She subsequently announced she would not seek re-election to the Scottish Parliament.

Following a fresh report by the Daily Record in January 2026, in which Duncan-Glancy was found to have continued her friendship with Morton after he had been sentenced for further offences in 2024, calls were made for her to resign immediately. A month later, in February 2026, Scottish Labour suspended her from the Holyrood parliamentary group.
