= Northern Ireland Local Government Association =

Organisation

- Abbreviation: NILGA
- Formation: 2001; 25 years ago
- Purpose: Local Government
- Headquarters: Castlereagh
- Region served: Northern Ireland
- Members: 11
- Website: https://www.nilga.org/

The Northern Ireland Local Government Association (NILGA) represents the interests of local government in Northern Ireland.

The Northern Ireland Local Government Association was established in 2001 to represent the interests of local government in Northern Ireland and has had a specific role in representing local government to the Northern Ireland Executive and the Northern Ireland Assembly.

Its members are the 11 local authorities in Northern Ireland.

The NILGA considers that its primary purposes are to promote better local government and the reputation of local government, and to support local authorities in the development of policies and priorities which will improve public services and democracy.

The NILGA has called for greater powers for its members, and for more funding for its members.

Sometimes it is communicates to the media on behalf of the media on issues such as the responsibilities of councils, rate-setting by councils.

The NILGA has been able to lead negotiations with the UK Government and the Northern Ireland Executive.

== See also ==
- Council of European Municipalities and Regions
- Convention of Scottish Local Authorities
- Local Government Association
- Welsh Local Government Association
