= Fochabers Lhanbryde (ward) =

Electoral ward in Moray, Scotland

Location of the ward

Fochabers Lhanbryde is one of the eight wards used to elect members of the Moray Council. It elects three Councillors.

== Councillors ==
Election	Councillors		
2007	Douglas Ross (Conservative)	George McIntyre (Independent)	Anita McDonald (SNP)
2012	Douglas Ross (Conservative)	Sean Morton (Labour)	Margo Howe (SNP)
2017	Marc Macrae (Conservative)	David Bremner (SNP)	Shona Morrison (SNP)
2022	Marc Macrae (Conservative)	Ben Williams (Labour)	Shona Morrison (SNP)

== Election results ==
=== 2022 results ===
Fochabers Lhanbryde - 3 seats
Party	Candidate	FPv%	Count				
Party	Candidate	FPv%	1	2	3	4	5
Conservative	Marc Macrae (incumbent)	39.7	1,590				
SNP	Shona Morrison (incumbent)	23.5	940	959	1,005		
SNP	David Bremner (incumbent)	19.4	778	792	812	816	
Labour	Ben Williams	10.1	404	535	831	831	1,178
Liberal Democrats	Donald Cameron	7.0	284	496			
Electorate: TBC Valid: 3,996 Spoilt: 68 Quota: 1,000 Turnout: 49.2%

=== 2017 Election ===
Fochabers Lhanbryde - 3 seats
Party	Candidate	FPv%	Count						
Party	Candidate	FPv%	1	2	3	4	5	6	7
Conservative	Marc Macrae	42.7	1,747						
SNP	Shona Morrison	16.7	682	702	708	738	759	794	872
SNP	David Bremner	17.4	711	722	729	752	760	792	862
Independent	Ian Taylor	6.7	274	361	374	441	578	701	
Liberal Democrats	Donald Cameron	5.2	211	318	394	445	511		
Independent	Kenneth Gillespie	4.1	166	282	294	344			
Independent	Sean Morton (incumbent)	5.3	215	284	289				
Liberal Democrats	Peter Horton	2.0	83	142					
Electorate: 8,089 Valid: 4,089 Spoilt: 71 Quota: 1,023 Turnout: 51.4%

=== 2012 Election ===
Fochabers Lhanbryde - 3 seats
Party	Candidate	FPv%	Count			
Party	Candidate	FPv%	1	2	3	4
Conservative	Douglas Ross (incumbent)	39.5	1,318			
SNP	Margo Howe	21.8	728	769	810	1,335
SNP	Anita McDonald (incumbent)	18.3	612	676	708	
Labour	Sean Morton	15.3	512	584	715	794
Liberal Democrats	Peter Horton	5.0	167	304		
Electorate: 7,717 Valid: 3,337 Spoilt: 28 Quota: 835 Turnout: 43.2%

=== 2007 Election ===
Fochabers Lhanbryde- 3 Seats
Party	Candidate	FPv%	Count								
Party	Candidate	FPv%	1	2	3	4	5	6	7	8	9
SNP	Anita McDonald	28.9	1,159								
Conservative	Douglas Ross	18.1	727	738	742	751	795	847	926	929	1,101
Independent	George McIntyre	15.1	608	623	630	640	675	826	1,017		
Labour	Lans Bangura	11.0	440	459	460	470	539	586	638	640	
Independent	Eddie Coutts	9.3	374	381	388	396	428	476			
Independent	Paul McBain	8.3	333	347	352	364	416				
Liberal Democrats	Peter Horton	7.2	287	310	314	319					
Independent	Gordon Davidson	1.4	56	61	67						
Independent	Alan Bodman	0.8	32	34							
Valid: 4,016 Spoilt: 45 Quota: 1,005 Turnout: 53.1%
