= Convention of Scottish Local Authorities =

National association of Scottish councils

- Abbreviation: COSLA
- Predecessor: Convention of Royal Burghs
- Founded: 1975
- Type: Voluntary association
- Purpose: Employers' organization
- Headquarters: Edinburgh
- Region served: Scotland
- Chief Executive: Jane O'Donnell
- Website: www.cosla.gov.uk

The Convention of Scottish Local Authorities (COSLA /ˈkɔːslə/) is the national association of Scottish councils and acts as an employers' association for its 32 member authorities.

== History ==
Formed in 1975, COSLA exists to promote and protect the interests of the country's councils by providing a forum for discussion of matters of common concern. COSLA ascertains the views of member councils and communicates these to central government, other bodies and the public.

It is the successor to the Convention of Royal Burghs, an organisation which dated back to the 12th century, but was dissolved after the local government changes of the 1970s.

In 2015, four Labour-run local authorities (Aberdeen City Council, Glasgow City Council, Renfrewshire Council and South Lanarkshire Council) left COSLA to form a new organisation, the Scottish Local Government Partnership. They all rejoined in 2017.

=== Chief Executives ===
- Jane O'Donnell (2023–present)
- Sally Loudon (2016–2023)
- Rory Mair (2001–2016)
- Oona Aitken (1999–2001)
- Douglas Sinclair (1996–1999)
- Roy MacIver (1990–1996)

=== Presidents ===
- Shona Morrison (2022–present)
- Alison Evison (2017–2022)
- David O'Neil (2012–2017)
- Pat Watters (2001–2012)
- Norman Murray (1999–2001)
- Keith Geddes (1996–1999)
- Rosemary McKenna (1992–1996)

== Structure ==
COSLA's headquarters are located at Verity House, Haymarket Yards, Edinburgh. Membership consists of all 32 councils in Scotland.

=== Leadership ===
COSLA employs over 100 members of staff across its policy teams and business units. COSLA's staff is led by its chief executive, Jane O'Donnell, supported by a Director for Place Policy, James Fowlie, Director of People Policy, Nicola Dickie and Director of Membership and Resources, John Wood.

Each of the teams is led by a chief officer. Collectively, they support COSLA's spokespeople and presidential team, and COSLA's decision making structures.

The political leadership of COSLA consists of a president, a vice-president, and five spokespersons, all of whom are councillors from the main political parties and independents.

The president and vice-president are the chair and vice chair of Convention and COSLA Leaders' meetings.

There are five spokespersons, four of whom each chair a policy board. The Resources Spokesperson reports directly to council leaders.

COSLA's political leadership consists of:

- President Councillor Shona Morrison (SNP - Moray)
- Vice President Steven Heddle (IND - Orkney)
- Children and Young People Spokesperson Councillor Tony Buchanan (SNP - East Ren)
- Environment and Economy Spokesperson Councillor Gail McGregor (CON - Dumfries and Galloway)
- Health and Social Care Spokesperson Councillor Paul Kelly (LAB - North Lan)
- Resources Spokesperson Councillor Katie Hagmann (SNP - Dumfries and Galloway)
- Community Wellbeing Spokesperson Councillor Maureen Chalmers (SNP - South Lan)

=== Decision-making ===
As a politically led, cross-party organisation, COSLA's decision making system is designed to put member councils at the heart of the policy development process.

==== Convention ====
The Convention of Scottish Local Authorities sets the strategic direction of the organisation and to discuss emerging priorities. Convention members reflect the political make up of every council and meet twice a year.

COSLA Leaders

Scotland's 32 council leaders meet eight times a year to focus on delivering COSLA's priorities and debate and agree its approach.

Policy Boards

COSLA's four policy boards are responsible for policy development and delivery. Each board is chaired by a spokesperson and includes a representative from every member council and relevant professional associations.

Special Interest Groups

Special interest groups look at specific issues and policies. A network of special interest groups take forward specific policy and work and focus on key issues in detail.

== COSLA Teams ==
=== Local Government Finance ===
The Local Government Finance Team seeks to ensure Councils receive adequate funding for local government services. Throughout the team's work, fiscal empowerment for local government is an overarching theme, linking directly with the strategic objective of strengthening local democracy.

The team has a key role in ensuring that local government is represented robustly and with authority in financial negotiations and discussions with both Scottish Government and Parliament and to ensure that financial flexibility is promoted at all levels.

The team also works very closely with professional advisers, such as local authority directors of finance and chief executives, to identify potential and current pressures and to provide a range of advice, options and recommendations to elected members on resource issues. The current financial climate presents many challenges for local government and the team works to advance the interests of local government in these financial discussions.

=== Children and Young People ===
The Children and Young People Team leads on education and children's services for COSLA. Its remit covers most aspects of a child's life from pre-birth through to post 16 education and into the world of work. The team's work includes pre-school, primary and secondary education; promoting and integrating children's services; developing effective approaches to children & family social work services; addressing child protection and youth justice issues as well as aspects of employability.

The team works closely with education, economic development, human resource and social work professionals in ADES (Association of Directors of Education), SLAED (Scottish Local Authority Economic Development network), SPDS (Society of Personnel Directors Scotland) and SWS (Social Work Scotland) to develop policy; to respond to and influence legislation and Scottish Government initiatives, and to provide support to elected members on the Education, Children and Young People Thematic Board.

=== Communities ===
The Communities Team's remit is to "promote the wellbeing and safety of communities across Scotland by securing the policies, powers and resources to enable councils to respond flexibly to local needs in promoting safe, healthy, socially cohesive and active communities; in ensuring quality, affordable housing; in providing access to cultural, sporting, learning and recreational opportunities; reducing reoffending and in tackling poverty and disadvantage."

=== Migration and Population ===
The Migration team provides strategic and political oversight on migration issues in a Scottish context. The team receives core funding from both the Scottish Government and the Home Office. The Scottish Government funding covers a wider range of priorities relating to migration in all its forms, as well as specific work around asylum seekers and refugees, and the Gypsy/Traveller community. The Home Office funding has an overt focus on issues associated with refugee resettlement and asylum seekers, wider migration-related issues are also dealt with by agreement between the two parties.

=== Environment and Economy ===
The team covers a wide range of policy and council services including inclusive economic growth, climate change, planning, the crown estate, transport and infrastructure.

=== Health and Social Care ===
The Health and Social Care team leads on all aspects of policy development and political lobbying relating to health and adult social care for COSLA. Its central objective is to ensure that health and social care services are sustainable, accessible, personalised and high quality, delivering on the jointly politically agreed National Health and Wellbeing Outcomes.

The Health and Social Care Team supports the Health and Social Care Board, Council Leaders and the COSLA Convention to provide political leadership and take decisions relating to health and social care on behalf of Local Government. The COSLA team works with partners across the Scottish Government, the NHS, Integration Joint Boards, relevant professional bodies and professional advisors to Local Government, regulatory bodies and the third and independent sectors in order to advance the political will of COSLA.

=== The Employers' Organisation ===
The COSLA Employers’ Organisation manages the delivery of strategic workforce priorities for Scottish local government, and provides national support services on human resource issues. The team provides strategic development, advice and guidance on workforce issues, undertakes pay bargaining and reward for all employee groups in the local government family.

=== Business Gateway National Unit ===
Business Gateway provides free business support and impartial advice, and helps thousands of start-up and existing businesses in Scotland each year. The Business Gateway National Unit is located within COSLA and provides national functions to support Local Authorities in the delivery of services at a local level.

The activities of the National Unit include:

- Local Engagement - providing support, guidance and expertise to assist the governance and management of the service
- Marketing – management of national and local marketing campaigns to raise awareness of the service, and management of www.bgateway.com and the Enquiry Service
- Operations – support with the consistent delivery and day-to-day management of the service across Scotland, and support with shared resources including the CRM system
- Performance Monitoring & Reporting – collates, monitors and reports national performance results from Local Authorities and other reporting sources
- Quality Assurance – undertaking a Quality Assurance customer survey programme to measure satisfaction on behalf of Local Authorities to drive service improvement
- Client Monitoring Survey – coordination of survey work to track the survival of clients who have had support to start-up in business
- Partnership Management – management of relationships with a range of national partner organisations

=== Trading Standards Scotland ===
Trading Standards Scotland (TSS) is the national team for trading standards in Scotland. The team is jointly funded by the UK Department for Business, Energy & Industrial Strategy and Her Majesty's Treasury; and managed by the Convention of Scottish Local Authorities (COSLA), the representative body of local government in Scotland.

Operationally, TSS has a duty to coordinate and enforce cross boundary and national casework as well as undertake the specialist functions of tackling illegal money lending and ecrime. It is a resource intended to add capacity to local authority trading standards teams in these areas of activity.

TSS has also developed an intelligence gathering and analysis function which allows the national team to identify a picture of Level 2 criminal activity (activity that takes place across council and/or national boundaries) and has implemented a tasking and coordination process to determine the allocation of resource to tackle it.

TSS is at the heart of policy development for local government and works closely with a number of partners including Police Scotland, the Society of Chief Officers of Trading Standards Scotland (SCOTSS) and Citizens Advice Scotland to strengthen protection for Scottish consumers.

=== COSLA Europe ===
COSLA's European work aims to ensure that the interests and rights of Scottish local government are safeguarded and advanced by EU policy and legislation.

The team advise Scottish MEPs on legislation affecting local government and support the work of the Scottish councillors who are members of the EU Committee of the Regions. COSLA is also an active member of the Council of European Municipalities and Regions (CEMR) – the EU umbrella body for local government – and the European Local Authority Network, working closely with other national associations of local government and with other Scottish public bodies based in Brussels, particularly the Scottish Government.

== See also ==
- Council of European Municipalities and Regions
- Local Government Association, in England and Wales
- Welsh Local Government Association
- Northern Ireland Local Government Association
