= Shona Morrison =

Scottish nurse and politician

Councillor Shona Morrison
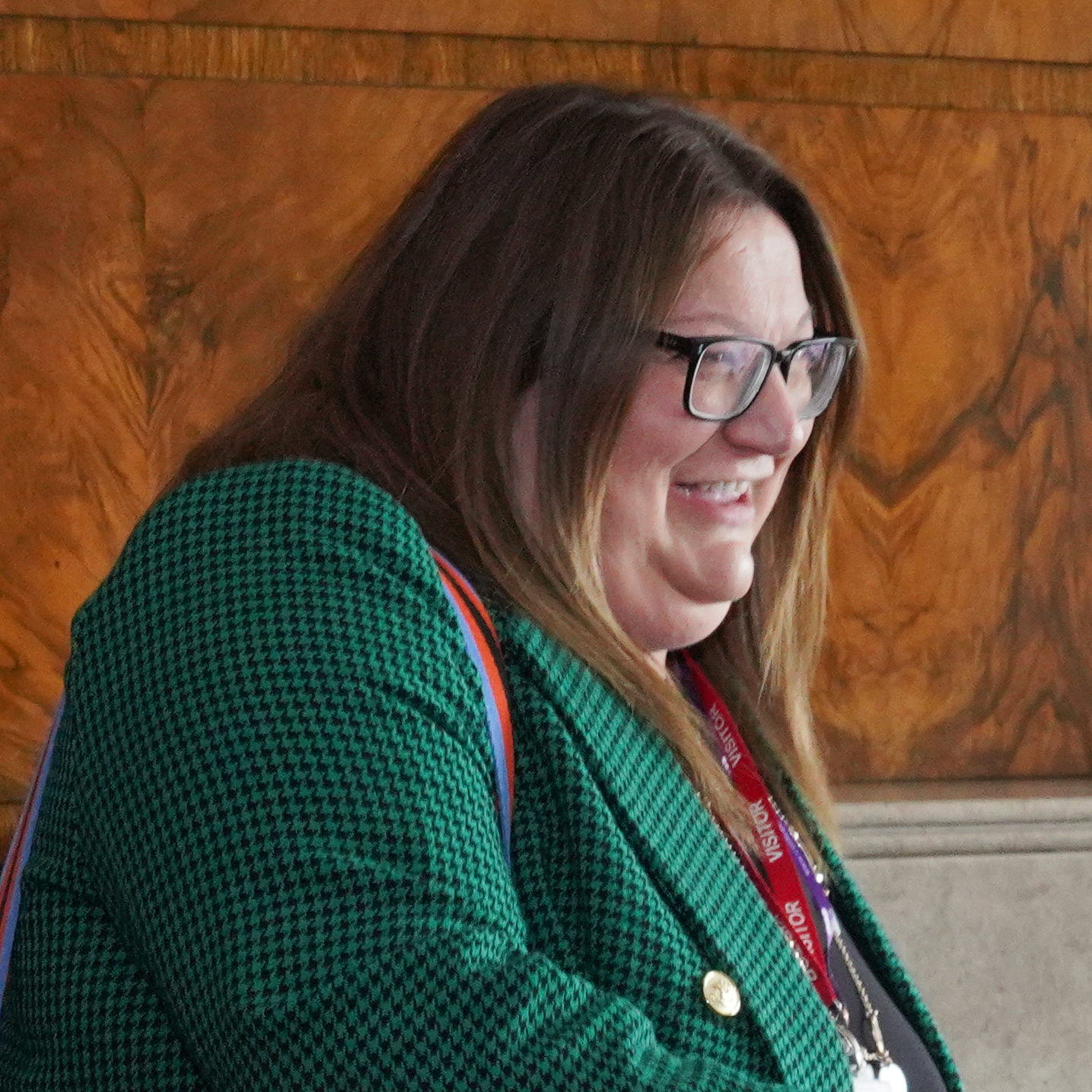
- Known for: President of COSLA
- Political party: Scottish National Party

Shona Morrison is a Scottish politician who has been a Councillor on the Moray Council since 2017 as a member of the Scottish National Party (SNP). Morrison has also served as the President of the Convention of Scottish Local Authorities (COSLA) since 2022.

== Early life and career ==
Morrison was born in Kintyre and went to a school in Inverness. Morrison pursued a career as a psychiatric nurse, and worked in the National Health Service.

== Political career ==
Morrison has served as a councillor for the Fochabers Lhanbryde ward since 2017. In 2018 the Conservative-Independent administration collapsed and the SNP formed a minority administration. As the SNP group's co-leader Morrison became Moray Council Convenor, the Council's first female Convenor. After becoming Convenor, Morrison also served as the chair of the Health and Social Care committee.

In 2021, as a member of the Council's committee on equalities, Morrison supported flying the Pride flag at the council's offices in Elgin, and at Secondary Schools around Moray.

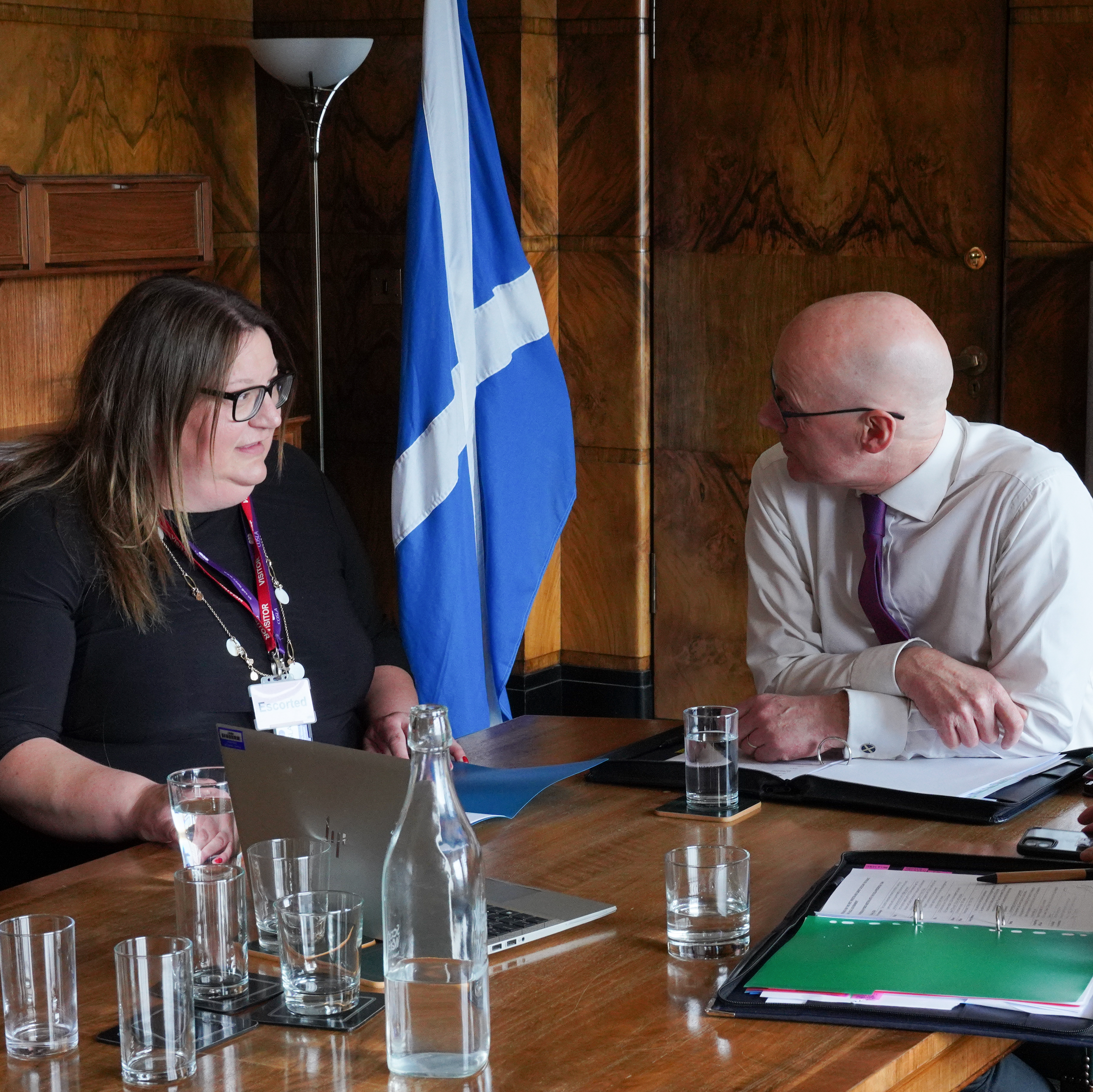
First Minister John Swinney with Shona Morrison in 2024

In June 2022 she was made the 16th President of the Convention of Scottish Local Authorities (COSLA). Morrison was the fourth woman to take that position and the first from the SNP.

In 2023 the Scottish Council for Development and Industry (SCDI) decided to relaunch itself under the new name of "Prosper" and as President of COSLA Morrison was involved in the process.
