= Convention of Royal Burghs =

Assembly of Scotland's trading towns

The Convention of Royal Burghs, more fully termed the Convention of the Royal Burghs of Scotland, was a representative assembly which protected the privileges and pursued the interests of Scotland's principal trading towns, the royal burghs, from the middle of the 15th century to the second half of the 20th century.

The convention evolved as a forum in which burgh delegates, termed "commissioners", could "consult together and take common action in matters concerning their common welfare "before and during the sittings of parliament. An exclusively merchant body, it was essentially a parliament which "declared the law of the burghs" just as the Scottish Parliament "declared the law of the land".

The Convention expanded over time by admitting lesser burghs to its membership; and by the 16th century had grown in influence to the extent that "it was listened to rather than directed by the government". Though still known as the "convention of royal burghs", it referred to itself from the late 17th century onwards as simply the "convention of burghs", as by then membership was no longer restricted exclusively to royal burghs and commissioners from all types of burgh were represented in parliament.

== Origin ==
The mediaeval roots of the Convention lay in the 13th-century Court of the Four Burghs which comprised delegates from Berwick, Edinburgh, Roxburgh and Stirling. (In 1369 Lanark and Linlithgow replaced Berwick and Roxburgh after these came under English occupation.) Representatives of these burghs met in advance of parliamentary sittings and communicated with the sovereign through the Court or through the Chamberlain who presided over its meetings in his function as the Crown's chief fiscal officer. The Court, described in a charter from the reign of James II (1430–60) as the Parliament of the Four Burghs, determined burghal law (leges burgorum), settled inter-burghal disputes and heard appeals from burgh courts. The earliest record of its deliberations dates from 1292 when "the four burghs" were asked to interpret the law on a question of debt. The Court applied a single set of rules and its decisions were binding on all royal burghs. (Note: Mackay gives the 16 original royal burghs in the reign of David I as Aberdeen, Dumfries, Edinburgh, Forfar, Haddington, Inverkeithing, Jedburgh, Lanark, Linlithgow, Montrose, Peebles, Perth, Rutherglen, St. Andrews, Selkirk, Stirling.)

The evolution of burgh representation in relation to the history of the Scottish Parliament was a long and gradual process, the record of which has been to a large extent obscured by the loss of Scotland's national records at various times in the country's history. The fragmentary nature of the surviving evidence makes it difficult to give a precise chronology of the development.

As the main source of specie in the kingdom the burghs were specially summoned by royal letters to convene at the sittings of parliament. The traditionally accepted date for the first occasion of their being present is 1326, when they were summoned to appear at the parliament of Robert I held at Cambuskenneth. The reason appears to have been the King's need to restore damage done to the royal demesnes during the Wars of Independence, It is not, however, clear whether the burgesses sat alongside the bishops and barons as a separate estate within the parliament itself.

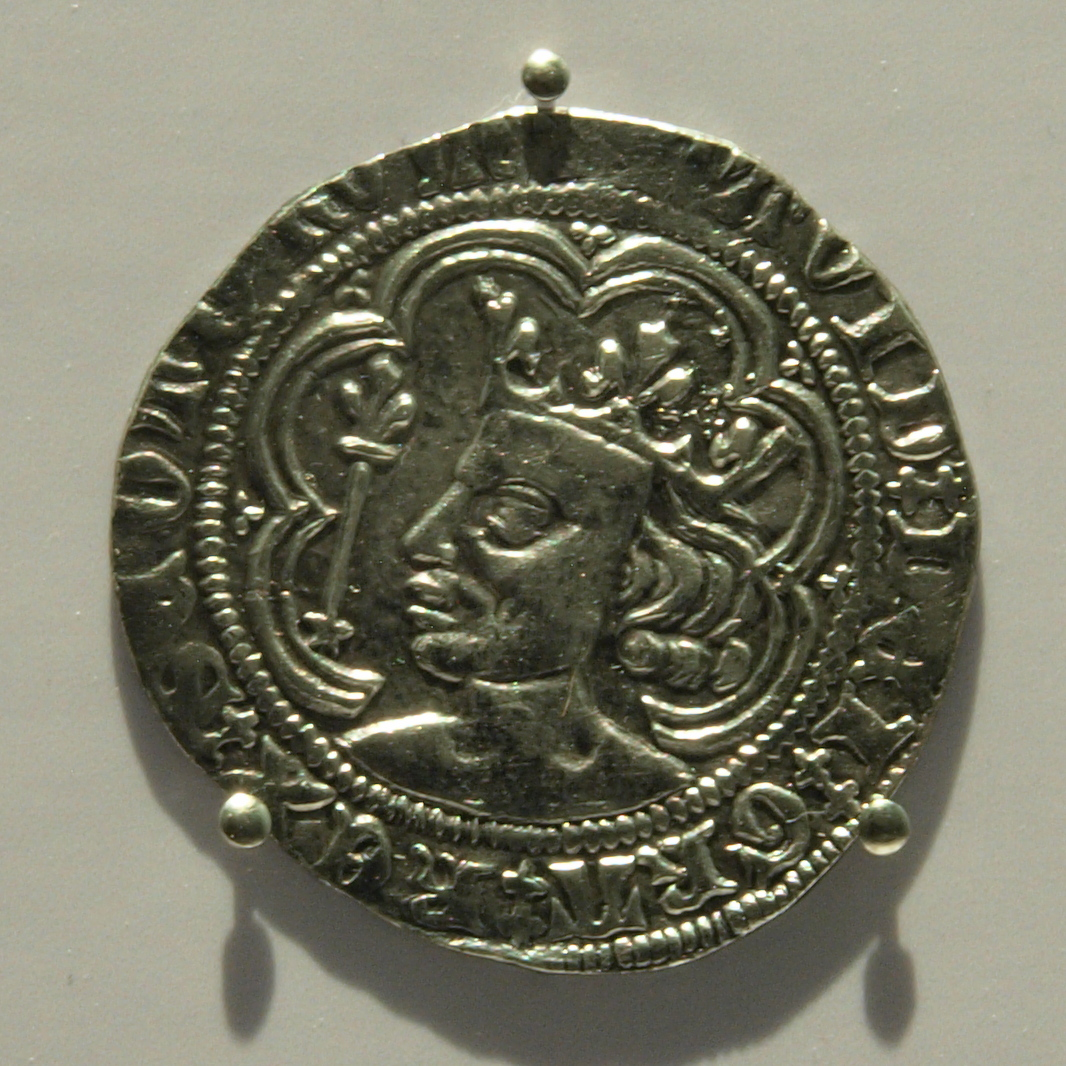
A groat from the reign of David II in the 14th century. Burghs were expected to pay their taxes in coin.

When taxation had to be raised to pay the ransom for the release of David II from English captivity, the burghs were consulted again at Scone in 1357 and empowered to negotiate the release. Thus, 1357 has been seen as the date for burgh commissioners establishing themselves as a political class within the parliament, indicated by the first use of the term "three estates (tres communitates) of the realm" to describe the parliament's composition.

The burghs were consulted again at the parliament held in Stirling in 1405 when 50,000 merks had to be raised for "the King's fynance", to meet Henry VI's demand for "expenses incurred" by James I during his long imprisonment in England. For this session it was decided that two or three commissioners from every burgh south of the Spey should attend to "treat, ordain and determine upon all things concerning the utility of the common weal of all the King’s burghs". Historians have therefore judged 1405 as the true date for the start of the convention, which met at every session of parliament from that time onwards.

The "Court of Four" continued to function until 1529, "the provost of the burgh where the meeting was held acting as president", though the Chamberlain still attended (his involvement ended formally in 1532).

== Reign of James III ==
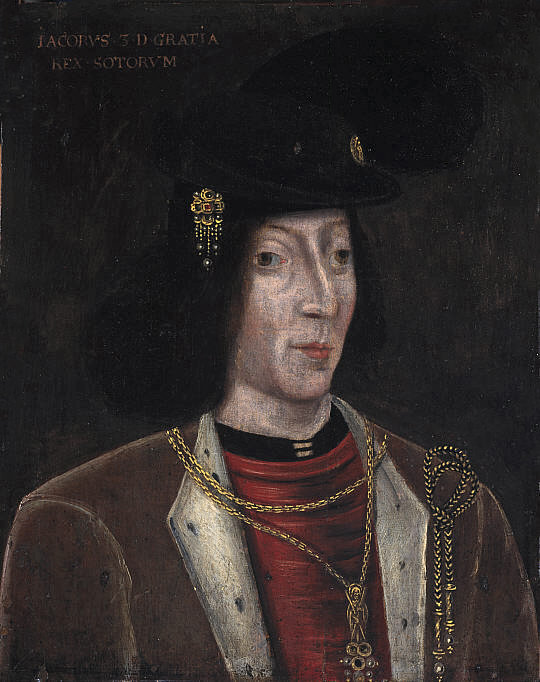
King James III

Royal Burghs Act 1487
- Act of Parliament
- Parliament of Scotland
- Long title: That certane commissionaris of borrowis convene in ilk yere.
- Citation: c. 17 [12mo ed: c. 111]

Dates
- Royal assent: 13 October 1487
Other legislation
| Amended by | Statute Law Revision (Scotland) Act 1906 |

Status: Amended

Text of the Royal Burghs Act 1487 as in force today (including any amendments) within the United Kingdom, from legislation.gov.uk.

The growing importance of the convention can be traced through the reign of James III (r.1460-88) when the burghs contributed one fifth of the total sum of national taxation granted by Parliament. From 1455 onwards, Parliament was attended on average by 16 burghs, rising to 22 in 1469, 23 in 1471 and 33 by the end of the reign in 1488. Geographical representation also widened and meetings became more frequent. The Royal Burghs Act 1487 (c. 17) ordained that commissioners of all burghs should meet annually to deal with matters of common concern.

...that Commissioners of all Burrowes baith south and north [of the Spey], sall convene and gadder together aince ilk yeare [annually] in the Burche of Inverkeithin [burgh of Inverkeithing], on the morning eftir Sanct James daie, with full commissioune, and thair to commune and treate upoune the weilfare of merchandise, the gude rule and statutis for the common profite of the Burrowis, and to provide for remeid upoune the skaith [damage] and injuries sustened, within the Burrowis, and quhat Burche that compeiris nocht [does not comply], the saides daie, be thair Commissaris, to paye to the costis of the Commissaris present, five pundis...

== 16th century ==
By the time more or less continuous (Note: A gap exists for 1631–49 when the records were lost or destroyed "during the troubilsum tymes" of the Wars of the Covenant.) records begin in the middle of the 16th century (1552), the Convention met regularly as a separate assembly to decide on a common policy for adoption by Parliament. The editor of its Records, Sir James Marwick, relates that the convention was summoned by royal letters in 1529, 1530–31, 1539 and 1556. Records from the regency of Mary of Guise suggest that the burghs themselves fixed the date and place of their conventions, a practice later confirmed by statute in 1581. In 1563 they gained the right to be consulted on "peace and war" and, from 1567, on "weighty affairs" of the realm. In 1578 James VI authorised them to meet "foure tymes in the yeare for sic materis as concerns thair Estait, and in quhatever Burche it sal be thocht expedient. Annual records of the Convention begin in that year.

Marwick summarised the Convention’s functions thus,

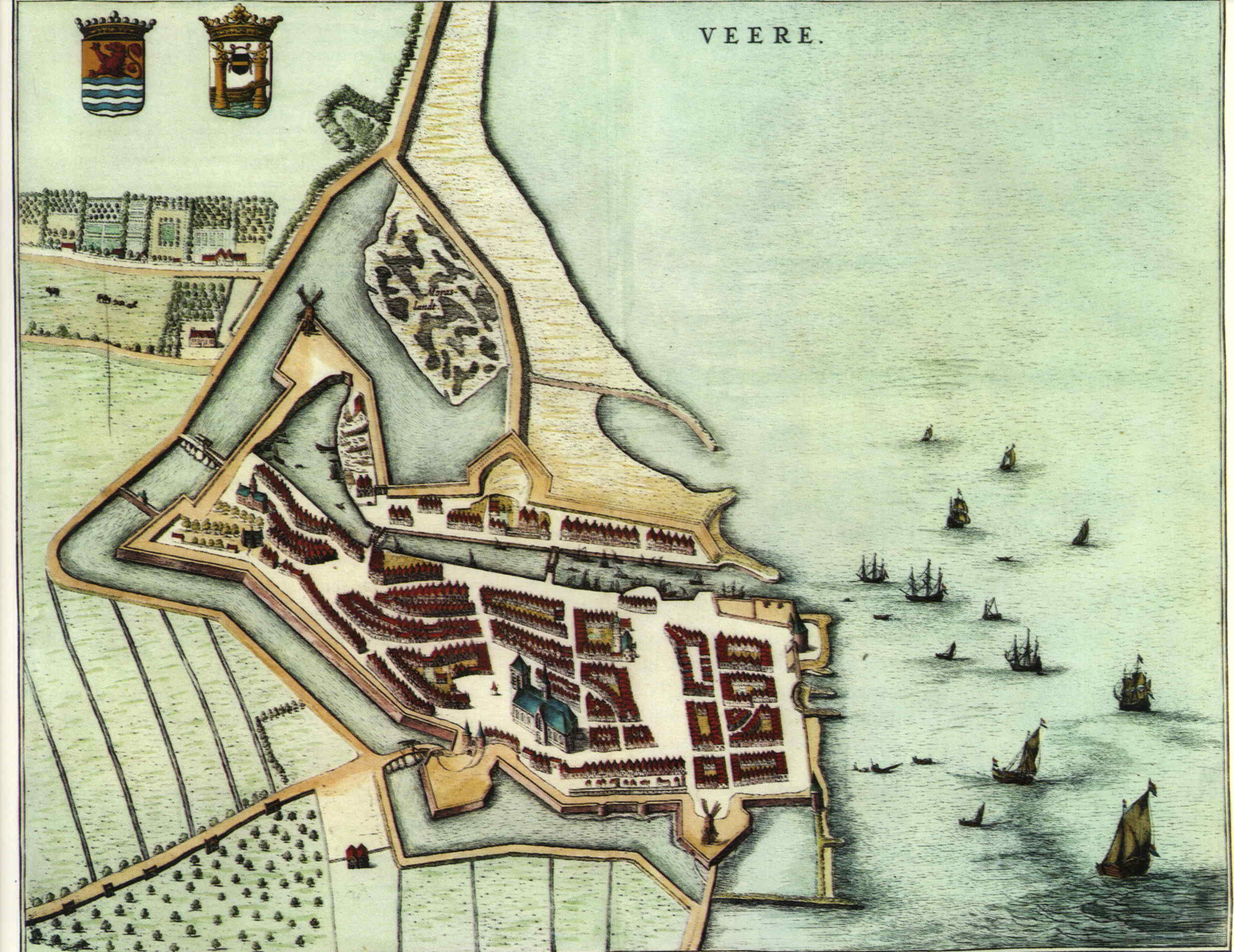
Blaeu map of Veere, Scotland's staple port in Flanders from 1541 to 1799

Scarcely anything affecting Burghs of Scotland, in their internal administration, or in their commercial relations at home and abroad, escaped the cognizance of the Convention. It defined the rights, privileges and duties of Burghs; it regulated the merchandise, manufactures and shipping of the country, it exercised control over the Scottish merchants in France, Flanders and other countries in Europe, with which from time to time commercial relations existed; it sent commissioners to foreign powers, and to great commercial communities, entered into treaties with them, and established the staple trade of Scotland wherever this could be most advantageously done: it claimed the right, independently of the Crown, to nominate the Conservator [official charged with safeguarding the privileges of the Scottish staple in Flanders]. And it certainly did regulate his emoluments, and control his conduct; it sometimes defrayed, and sometimes contributed towards, the expenses of ambassadors from the Scottish Court to that of France and other foreign powers in matters affecting the Burghs and the common weal; it allocated among the whole Burghs of the Kingdom their proportion of all extents and taxes granted by the three Estates of the realm; it adjudicated on the claims of Burghs to be admitted to the privileges of free Burghs, and to be added to its roll; it took cognizance of weights and measures."

(The agreed weights and measures were based on the "stane wecht" [stone weight] of Lanark, the "pint stoupe" [liquid measure] of Stirling, the "firlatt" [quarter-boll—a dry measure of meal] of Linlithgow and the "elland" [length, e.g. of cloth] of Edinburgh)

== 17th century ==
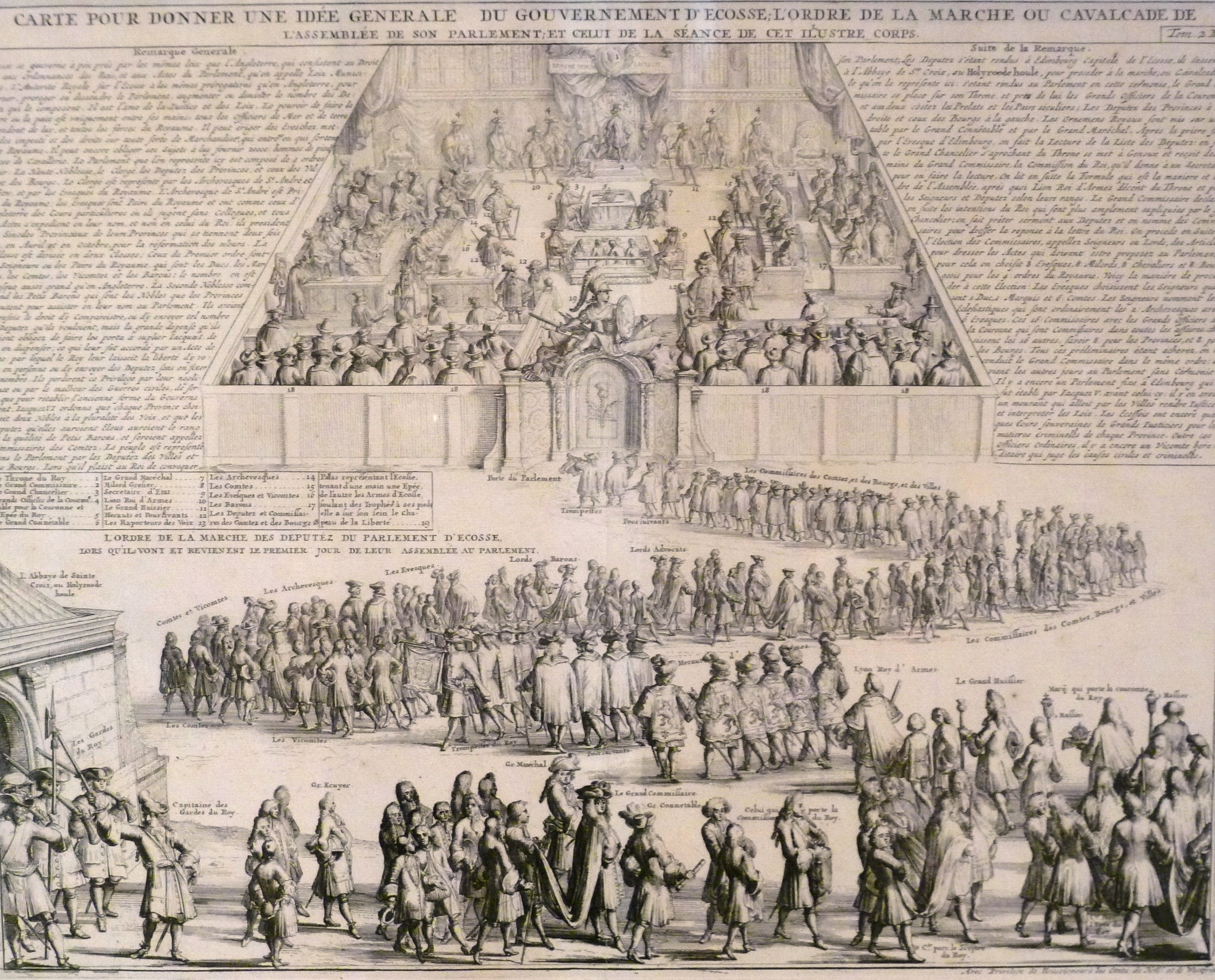
18thC French illustration of an opening of the Scottish Parliament. The procession is headed by "Les Commissaires des Comtes, et des Bourgs, et des Villes".

On 21 August 1604, the Convention agreed articles for the guidance of the Scottish Commissioners appointed to negotiate arrangements under the Union of the Crowns. The first called for the upholding of Scots Law, "that the inhabitants of Scotland be ruled and governed by the laws of this realme, and no way subject to any other law"; the second urged "that in the Treaty of Union nothing be touched which may prejudice the ancient liberties, privileges, immunities, infeftments [possession of heritable property], and laws, made in favour of the burghs by his Majesty and his Highnesses most noble progenitors."

The relative importance of the Convention in the 17th century can be judged from a statement made by the Lord Advocate, George Mackenzie of Rosehaugh, that "The burrows of Scotland have liberty to meet in time of Parliament, and to propose as a Body and Third Estate, Overtures for Trade; but no other estate of Parliament can lawfully meet [i.e. outside Parliament], this being a singularity indulged to them for the Good of Commerce." Burghs of regality or of barony, hitherto excluded from participating in foreign trade, were accorded the privilege in 1672. but to maintain the pre-eminent position of the royal burghs an act of Parliament, the Royal Burghs Act 1690 (April c. 15) stipulated the sum to be paid by the lesser burghs to reduce the burden of taxation imposed on the royal burghs. By 1689, 70 burghs were members of the convention, though, according to one study, the royal burghs remained the dominant influence throughout the period: "...meetings did not always involve the whole estate suggesting that a smaller group of wealthier burghs were the driving force behind the convention in general and burghs' parliamentary agenda in particular.

== Later importance ==
It has been argued that the effect of the convention was to make the burgesses historically the most organised of the three estates represented in the Scots parliament. It also

"… ensured that urban government was much more uniform in Scotland than in England, producing, as the commissioners' inquiry into the Municipal Corporations of Scotland discovered in 1833–1835, considerable corruption amongst self-electing, clone-like burgh establishments".

The main concern of the convention in the early part of the 19th century became

"… the blocking of reform. The Municipal Reform Act of 1834 sharply reduced its influence and its abolition was considered for a time. The admission to it of parliamentary burghs in 1879 and police burghs in 1895 gave it an added lease of life though probably little extra influence."

The convention was viewed by Westminster politicians in the late 19th century as "thoroughly representative of public opinion in Scotland" and "as giving those who have to deal with the affairs of Scotland an opportunity of feeling the pulse of Scotland". In 1899, it consisted of 103 burghs and 207 representatives in an organisation described by a Scottish government minister as "the oldest existing representative body in Europe". The same study observes that, "the Convention can probably lay claim to being one of the wordiest of Scottish institutions, if measured by the voluminous nature of its records. But its importance was relatively slight".

The convention was abolished when local government was regionally reorganised in 1975 in line with the recommendations of the Wheatley Report of 1969. It was superseded by the present-day Convention of Scottish Local Authorities (COSLA).

== See also ==
- Royal burgh
