= Local Government Association =

UK association of local authorities (1997–present)

- Abbreviation: LGA
- Formation: 1 April 1997; 29 years ago
- Purpose: Local Government
- Headquarters: London
- Region served: England; Wales (through WLGA)
- Members: 339
- Chief Executive: Jenny Rowlands
- Chair: Eamonn O'Brien
- President: Tanni Grey-Thompson
- Website: https://www.local.gov.uk

- Applies to: England
- Relates to: Local government in England

Other UK counterparts
- Northern Ireland: Northern Ireland Local Government Association
- Scotland: Convention of Scottish Local Authorities
- Wales: Welsh Local Government Association

The Local Government Association (LGA) is the national membership body for local authorities in England. Its core membership is made up of 316 of 317 English councils, while the 22 Welsh councils are also members through the Welsh Local Government Association.

The LGA is politically-led and cross-party. As the national voice of local government, it works on behalf of councils to give local government a voice with national government, to promote the reputation of the sector and to secure funding and powers on behalf of councils and the communities they serve. It aims to support councils to improve and innovate through peer-based support, and it co-ordinates collective legal actions on behalf of the sector.

The LGA also provides membership services to other organisations through an associate scheme, including fire and rescue authorities, national parks authorities, town councils, police & crime commissioners and elected mayors of combined authorities.

In July 2024, Shaun Davies became the first LGA chair to be elected to the House of Commons. Eamonn O'Brien, Leader of Bury Council was appointed Chair in July 2026; the interim chief executive is Jenny Rowlands.

The LGA is represented on the Local Government Leaders' Council by its chair.

== History ==
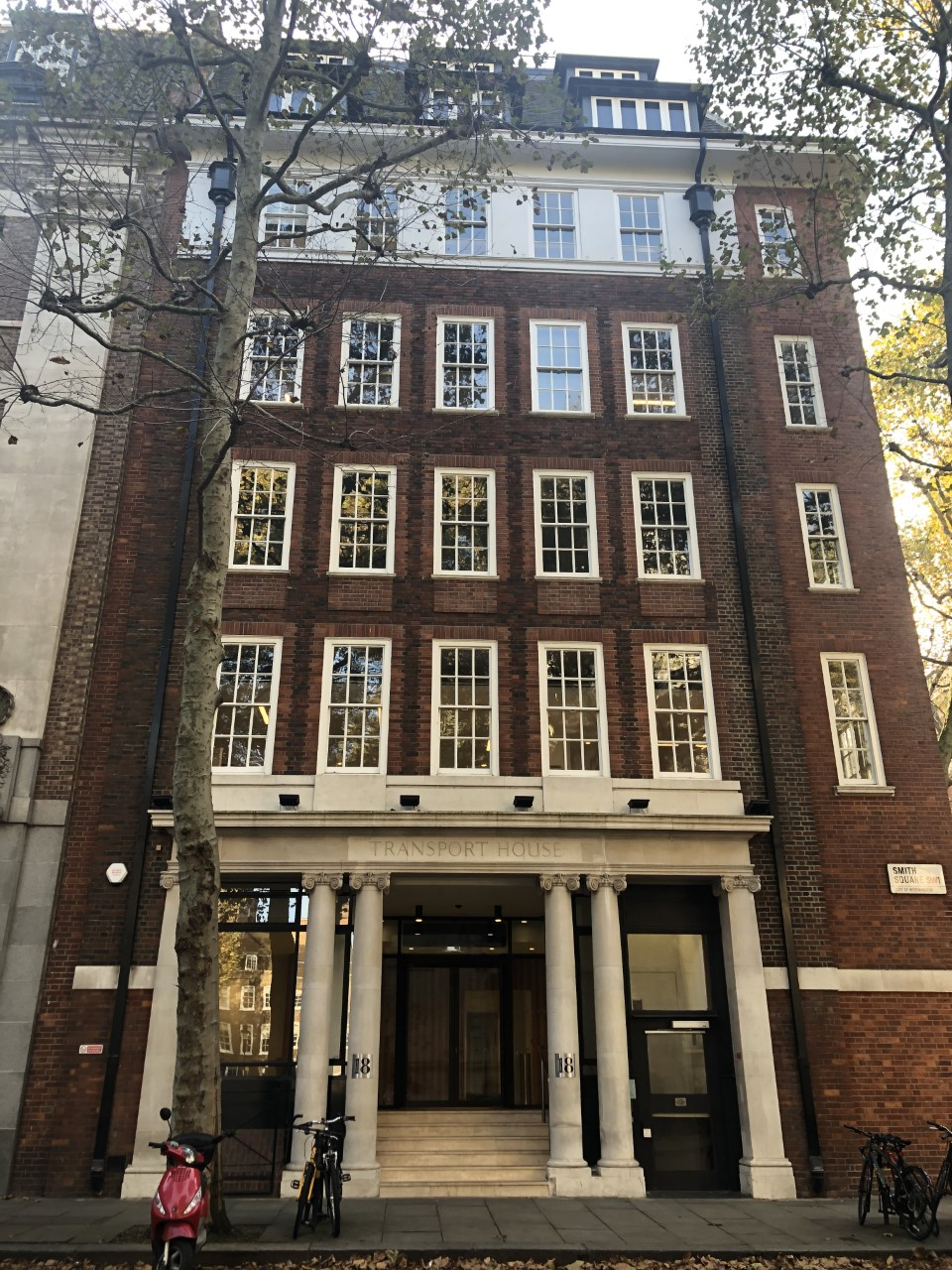
Local Government Association building, Smith Square, Westminster

On 1 April 1997, the Association of County Councils, the Association of District Councils and the Association of Metropolitan Authorities came together to form a single membership body for local government in England – the Local Government Association (LGA).

In 2010, the LGA merged with the Improvement and Development Agency (IDeA), Local Government Employers (LGE), Local Authority Co-ordinators of Regulatory Services (LACORS) and the Leadership Centre for Local Government. The IDeA, whilst wholly owned by the LGA, continues to exist as a company and the recipient of central government grant for improvement activities. The Leadership Centre is now an independent body based in North London.

In April 2019, the former unincorporated LGA was replaced by the LGA unlimited company, enabling it to hold title to its two properties – its headquarters in Smith Square, Westminster and the former IDeA headquarters in Farringdon.

The LGA’s annual meeting – the General Assembly – takes place on the first Tuesday of July each year. The 2019 assembly passed a motion declaring a climate emergency and calling on government to explore the domestic implementation of the UN Sustainable Development Goals (SDGs) through funded partnership roles with local authority areas and encouraging councils to continue to link local priorities with the overall ambitions of the SDGs.

== Chairs of the LGA ==
- Jeremy Beecham (1997–2004)
- Lord Bruce-Lockhart (2004–2007)
- Sir Simon Milton (2007–2008)
- Baroness Eaton (2008–2011)
- Sir Merrick Cockell (2011–2014)
- David Sparks (2014–2015)
- Lord Porter of Spalding (2015–2019)
- Lord Jamieson (2019–2023)
- Shaun Davies (2023–2024)
- Louise Gittins (2024–2026)
- Eamonn O'Brien (2026-present)

== Chair and vice chairs ==
Role	Councillor	Council
Chair	Eamonn O'Brien	Bury Council
Senior Vice chair (Conservative)	Kevin Bentley	Essex County Council
Vice chair (Liberal Democrats)	Bridget Smith	South Cambridgeshire District Council
Vice chair (Labour)	Bev Craig	Manchester City Council
Vice chair (Independent)	Hannah Dalton	Epsom and Ewell Borough Council
Vice Chair (Reform UK)	Stephen Atkinson	Lancashire County Council
Vice Chair (Green)	Emily O'Brien	Lewes District Council

== Main priorities ==
In June 2024, the LGA published its Local Government White Paper, which set out their five priorities:

- An equal, respectful partnership between local and national government
- Sufficient and sustainable funding with multi-year settlements
- Backing local government as place leaders with new powers
- A new focus on prevention and services for the wider community
- Innovation and freedom from bureaucracy through the use of artificial intelligence

== Associated companies ==
The LGA has a number of associated companies.

- GeoPlace is a joint venture between the LGA and Ordnance Survey
- LGA (Digital Services) is a partnership between the LGA and Brent Council
- Public Sector Audit Appointments Ltd is wholly owned by the LGA through the IDeA company
- LGA Commercial Services Ltd is wholly owned by the LGA
- The LGA is a founder member of the Local Government Mutual (LGM) and a shareholder in the UK Municipal Bonds Agency (UKMBA)
- Local Partnerships is a joint venture between the LGA, HM Treasury and the Welsh Government

== See also ==
- Convention of Scottish Local Authorities
- Northern Ireland Local Government Association
- Welsh Local Government Association
- Regional employers organisations
