= Welsh Local Government Association =

Welsh local governance advisory body

- Cymdeithas Llywodraeth Leol Cymru (Welsh)
- Abbreviation: WLGA; CLlLC
- Formation: 1 April 1996; 30 years ago
- Purpose: Local government
- Headquarters: Cardiff
- Region served: Wales
- Members: 22
- Website: https://www.wlga.wales/home

The Welsh Local Government Association (WLGA; Welsh: Cymdeithas Llywodraeth Leol Cymru, CLlLC) represents the interests of local authorities in Wales. It is affiliated with the Local Government Association in England and acts as Wales’ regional employers organisation.

== History ==
The Welsh Local Government Association was established in 1996 to represent the interests of local government in Wales. Since 1999 the WLGA has had a specific role in representing local government to the Welsh Government and the Senedd (Welsh Parliament).

== Members ==
Its members are the twenty-two local authorities in Wales. The four police authorities, three fire and rescue authorities, and three national park authorities in Wales are associate members.

Town and community councils are outside the WLGA's ambit. They are represented by One Voice Wales

== Purpose ==
The WLGA considers that its primary purposes are to promote better local government and the reputation of local government, and to support local authorities in the development of policies and priorities which will improve public services and democracy.

== Activities ==
=== Autism spectrum awareness programme ===
Tesco, a multinational supermarket chain, has implemented training for its employees to meet the needs of its customers who are on the autism spectrum, which is estimated to be one of every 100 people in the United Kingdom. Employees use an online training site and respond to a questionnaire to assess the extent to which they became more aware of autism spectrum disorders (ASD). Tesco is the first company to participate in an awareness programme led by the Welsh Local Government Association (WLGA). The online training and questionnaire tool is intended to be used by many organisations in Wales to identify and commend businesses that are "ASD Aware".

== See also ==
- Partnership Council for Wales, a statutory body which brings together the leaders of Wales local authorities and Welsh ministers
