= Billingham Manufacturing Plant =

Chemical factory in Stockton-on-Tees, England

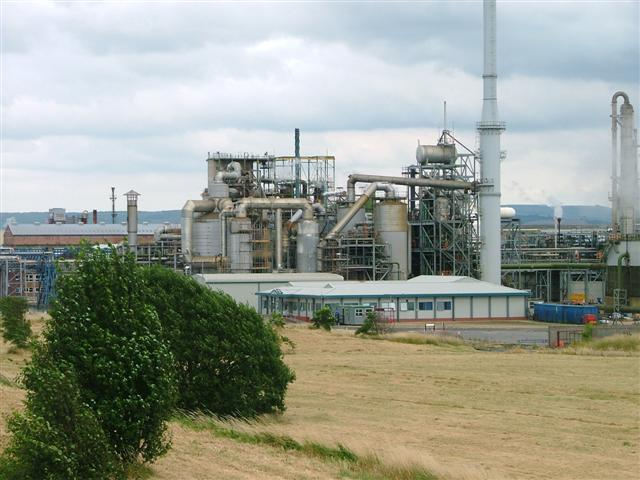
- Chemical works

- Location within County Durham
- Former names: Brunner Mond, ICI

General information
- Type: Chemical works
- Location: Borough of Stockton-on-Tees, Billingham, TS23 1PY
- Coordinates: 54.59107°N 1.2607°W
- Elevation: 12 m (39 ft)
- Landlord: CF Fertilisers UK Limited

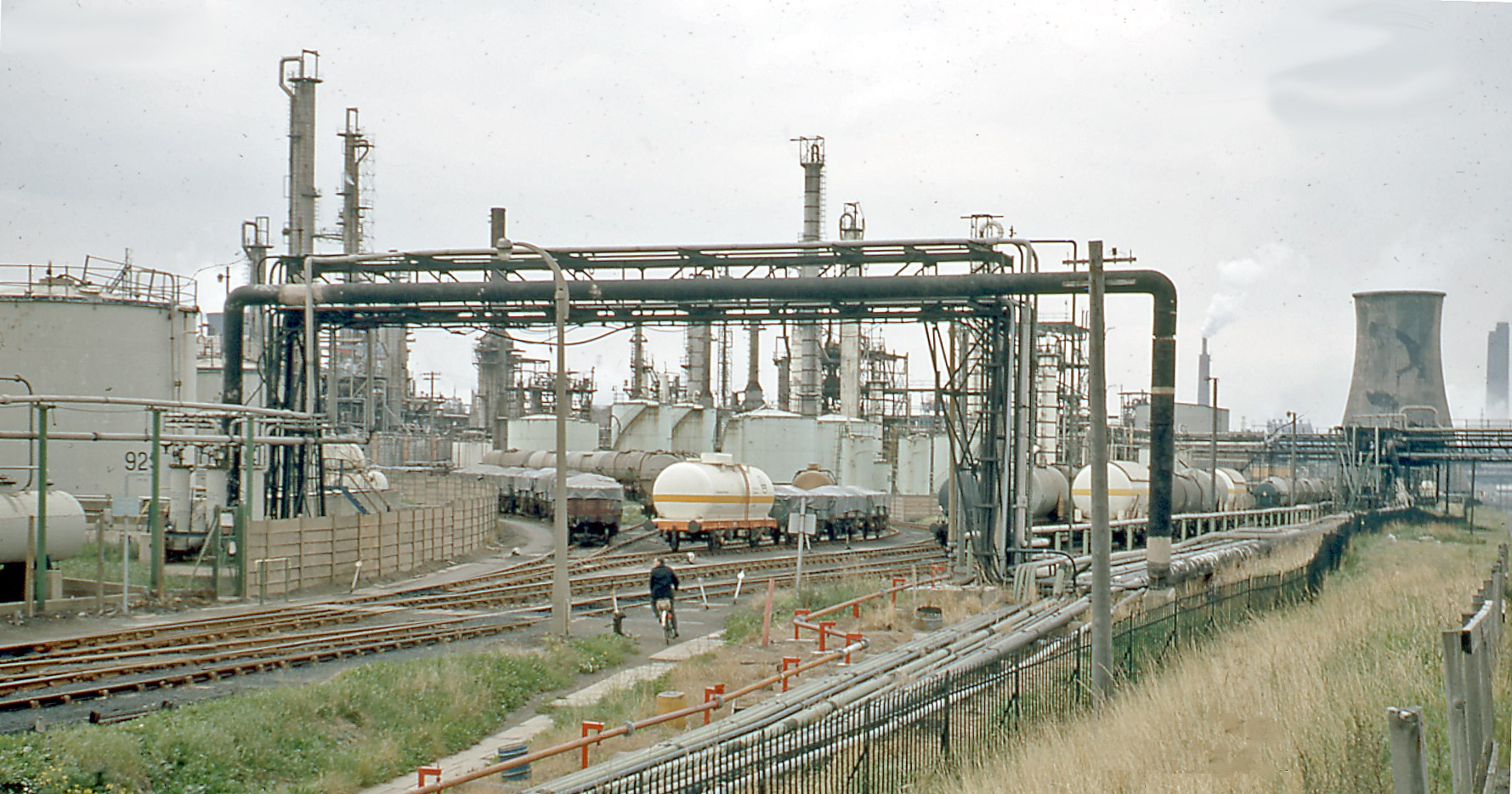
Billingham Plant in 1970

The Billingham Manufacturing Plant is a large chemical works based in the Borough of Stockton-on-Tees, England. In agricultural terms, it is one of the most important factories in Britain.

== History ==
=== Brunner Mond ===
Billingham was a small village in the 19th century and agriculture was the main industry.

On 22 March 1918, the Minister of Munitions approved the site to be development of hundred acres of flat land at Grange Farm to make way for a factory that would make ammonium nitrate. It was initially known as the Government Nitrogen Factory.

In 1920 it was taken over by Brunner and Mond who turned the synthetic ammonia into fertiliser. In 1926 Brunner Mond merged with Nobel Explosives, the United Alkali Company, and British Dyestuffs Corporation to form Imperial Chemical Industries.

=== ICI ===
In December 1926, ICI was formed from the merger of Brunner Mond, Nobel Explosives, the United Alkali Company and the British Dyestuffs Corporation, largely controlled by Alfred Mond, 1st Baron Melchett, and Harry McGowan, 1st Baron McGowan. By 1932, the plant employed around 5,000 people.

Aldous Huxley visited the works and this gave him the inspiration for his famous 1931 book Brave New World.

From 1929 the Bergius process was developed to hydrogenate carbon (coal) and make synthetic petrol, with production starting in 1935. This would be needed for aircraft several years later. The Fischer–Tropsch process was used by the Germans during the war to produce synthetic fuel from coal. The RAF's high-performance aircraft needed 100-octane fuel, which was only obtainable from hydrogenated fuels, such as that made at Billingham. Another synthetic fuel (iso-octane) plant at Heysham in Lancashire was built in 1941, where it was thought safer. The synthetic fuel processes at Billingham and Heysham both relied on catalysts for the conversion of the coal synthesis gas to fuel. These catalysts were made in Clitheroe in a plant set up by the government as a shadow factory. Clitheroe was chosen for being in a part of the UK with the most cloud cover, which could help protect against German bombers.

The ammonia produced at Billingham used coal as the feedstock for many years. The coal-based process was complex and inefficient with many safety and environmental issues. In the 1950s ICI developed technology to convert naphtha to hydrogen by reacting with steam over a catalyst in tubes in a furnace. Four large steam reformers were built and these significantly improved the ammonia production process. The technology was successfully licensed by ICI to many plants around the world and the associated catalyst sales became an important ICI business. In the early 1960s ICI licensed ammonia technology from M. W. Kellogg, an American engineering company who had been developing single-stream continuous ammonia processes with capacity up to 550 tonnes per day. ICI ordered 3 plants, each with capacity of 900 tonnes per day and hence the world's largest. The new Kellogg technology synthesised ammonia at only 150 bar, about half that used in other processes, resulting in greatly improved energy efficiency. The new plants took some time to overcome teething problems with the new technology but eventually became the key part of the factory, which for many years was the world's largest ammonia production site. The Kellogg Low Pressure ammonia plants were eventually retired in the 1990s.

In the 1960s ICI developed new catalysts that would allow the production of methanol at much lower pressures than previously used. This led to ICI building the world's first Low Pressure methanol at Billingham in 1966, in a plant making 600 tonnes per day of methanol at only 50 bar and using hydrogen from the old steam reformer plants (which were no longer needed for ammonia production). A second and larger methanol plant was built in 1971. The methanol technology was licensed to more than 100 other companies (in conjunction with sales of ICI catalyst made at Clitheroe) and for many years more than half of the world's methanol was made with ICI technology and catalysts.

In the late 1960s, scientists searching for alternative protein sources discovered a soil micro fungus called Fusarium venenatum near the Thames in Marlow, Buckinghamshire. ICI provided the large-scale industrial fermenters and fermentation expertise needed to grow the fungus on a commercial level.

In the late 1960s, a plant was built to convert ammonia and nitric acid (made at Billingham from ammonia in separate plants) to ammonium nitrate, a popular fertiliser due to its high nitrogen content and sold using the Nitram brand name. A second Nitram plant was built in the 1970s.

In the 1970s, North Sea gas became available and the steam reformers at Billingham were converted from naphtha to natural gas feed. As one of the first and largest gas customers, ICI was able to negotiate a very favourable gas price which meant that the 1970s was a period of high profitability for the site.

A fourth large ammonia plant was built in the mid-1970s, with a capacity of 1500 tonnes per day. Ammonia 4 was designed with improved efficiency and reliability and is still operating in the 2020s.

In the late 1970s, ICI developed a fermentation process that converted methanol to artificial protein called Pruteen, intended to be used as animal feed. A commercial production unit was built on Belasis Avenue, a short distance to the main Billingham site. The start of the new plant coincided with increases in gas and methanol prices and a drop in the cost of competing animal feeds which made commercial success difficult for the new plant.

By the 1980s, the Billingham site was divided into 4 production groups – Ammonia Works (ammonia and methanol), Products Works (nitric acid and Nitram as well as sulfuric and phosphoric acids used to make compound "NPK" fertiliser), Oil Works and Cassel Works (whose main product is methyl methacrylate monomer, the precursor of Perspex).

In the early 1980s, British musician Eric Woolfson paid a visit to the factory having been invited by the then ICI chairman John Harvey-Jones. The first thing Woolfson saw was a kind of street full of pipes where nobody worked, with a sign which said Ammonia Avenue. It would end up being photographed for the front cover for The Alan Parsons Project's seventh studio album, which was also named after the place.

The last major investment at Billingham was a large nitric acid plant with a capacity of 1000 tonnes per day that started operation in 1985.

In the 1990s the 3 LP ammonia plants were retired, along with the first Nitram plant and associated acid plants. This was mostly due to pressure of low-price competition from regions of the world with much lower costs of natural gas feed. The methanol production also stopped a little later for similar reasons.

ICI sold its interest in Quorn in 1993.

In 1997 ICI sold the fertiliser production plants an Billingham and those at a similar, but smaller, production site at Severnside near Bristol to Terra for $340 million.

In 1999 ICI sold Cassel Works to Ineos and it subsequently became Lucite International.

In 2002 ICI sold the catalyst and technology licensing business that was headquartered at Billingham to Johnson Matthey for £267 million.

=== Second World War ===
In the Second World War, atomic research also took place on the site, under the codename Tube Alloys, whereby uranium hexafluoride was made. Plastics were also made on the site from 1934, which were used in the construction of aircraft cockpits. The plant also made explosives, as synthetically originated nitrogen compounds (such as trinitrotoluene) all derive from ammonia, due to the immense energetic difficulty in splitting bonds in the nitrogen molecule.

=== Nuclear reactor ===
A TRIGA nuclear reactor was developed on the site from 1971 to 1988. Tracerco was developed from this operation, and ICI's Physics and Radioisotope Services.

=== CF Fertilisers ===
The plant was sold by ICI to Terra Nitrogen (UK), part of the Terra Nitrogen Company, in 1997. Terra formed a joint venture in 2006 with Kemira Growhow, who operated the UK's only other ammonium nitrate plant (in Cheshire) and the joint business used the Growhow name. In 2007 Yara, a Norwegian-based fertiliser company, took a controlling interest in Kemira Growhow. In 2010 CF Industries bought a 50% share of Growhow and in 2015 bought the remaining 50% from Yara. GrowHow was rebranded to CF Fertilisers in November 2015.

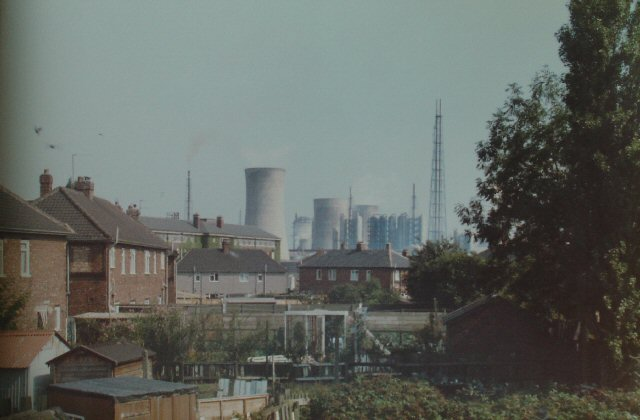
ICI plant seen from the town

== Structure ==
It is sandwiched between Belasis Avenue (B1275) and the A1046 in the south-east of Billingham, close to the bank of the River Tees. The A19 runs nearby to the west.

=== Energy ===
Natural gas is supplied at between 45 and 65 bar. The site uses around 1% of the UK's natural gas. Electricity used to come from its own power station and also from the former North Tees Power Station (which closed in 1983), but is now supplied from the National Grid.

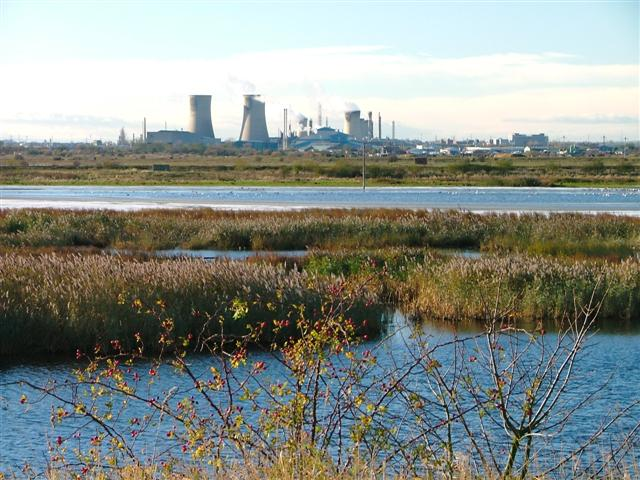
Plant seen from Saltholme Marshes near Haverton Hill

=== Food biology ===
ICI Biological Products at Billingham developed the means to make the Quorn meat substitute. It would was discovered in the late 1960s in Marlow in Buckinghamshire. The site would have become Zeneca in early the 1990s.

The fermentation process was developed in 1975, from methanol formed from natural gas, at the world's largest fermentation plant, costing £40m, to open in 1979, making 75,000 tonnes per year by bacteria methylophilus methylotrophus, which works via the methanol dehydrogenase enzyme in a methylotroph bacteria.

== Function ==
It fixates nitrogen, a highly energy-thirsty process, by converting it to ammonia via the Haber process, also known as the Haber–Bosch process. From ammonia, the vast majority of fertilisers are made, leading to protein formation in plants and then animals. Naturally occurring sodium nitrate or potassium nitrate are also used in fertilisers.

== See also ==
- CF Fertilisers UK plant at Ince, Cheshire (north of the M56 and west of the Stanlow Oil Refinery), built in 1968 by Shell Chemicals (Shellstar)
- History of fertiliser
- ICI at Wilton
- Billingham Synthonia F.C. – named after the plant's product – synthetic ammonia (synthonia)

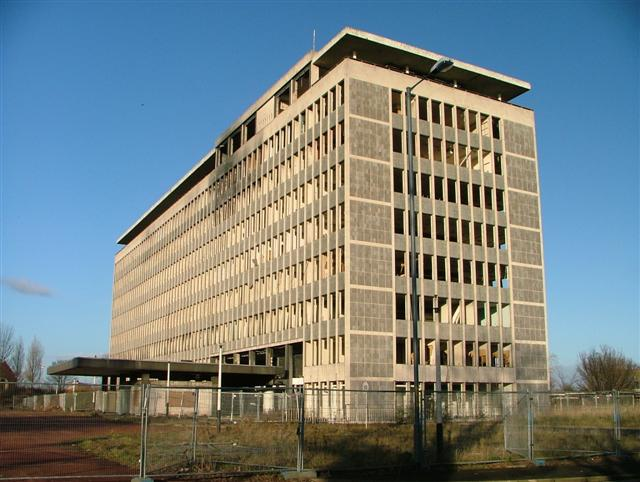
Former ICI office building of Billingham House
