= Robert Shanks =

Robert Shanks may refer to:

- Robert Shanks (footballer)
- Robert Shanks (pharmacologist)
