= Billingham Campus School and Arts College =

Billingham Campus School

Location
- Marsh House Avenue; Billingham, North Yorkshire, TS23 3HB; England
- Coordinates: 54°36′56″N 1°16′54″W

Information
- Type: Comprehensive
- Closed: 2009
- Local authority: Stockton-on-Tees
- Department for Education URN: 111754 Tables
- Gender: Coeducational
- Age: 11 to 18
- Enrolment: 850

Billingham Campus School and Arts College was a co-educational comprehensive secondary school and Specialist Arts College, located on Marsh House Avenue in the town of Billingham, England.

== History ==
It used to be known as Bede Hall Grammar School. There were also three secondary modern schools on the site – Faraday, Davy and Stephenson.

In September 1972, Bede Hall Grammar became comprehensive although the remaining four grammar years remained so. The school was renamed Brunner. Davy and Faraday merged into one school named Furness. Stephenson closed and became Bede College the pupils transferring to Furness or the newly opened Northfield school.

The science block suffered an arson attack on 1 October 2002. The £1.2 million Stockton City Learning Centre opened on 23 January 2003.

In 2009, Billingham Campus was closed and merged with Northfield School, another secondary school in Billingham. The Billingham Campus was called Northfield Sports College Marsh House site, but subsequently closed in 2013 when operations transferred to Northfield's Thames Road base.

== Alumni ==
- Diane Youdale
- Melanie Sabina Brown
