= Cowpen Bewley =

Coordinates: 54.614°N 1.255°W

- Village
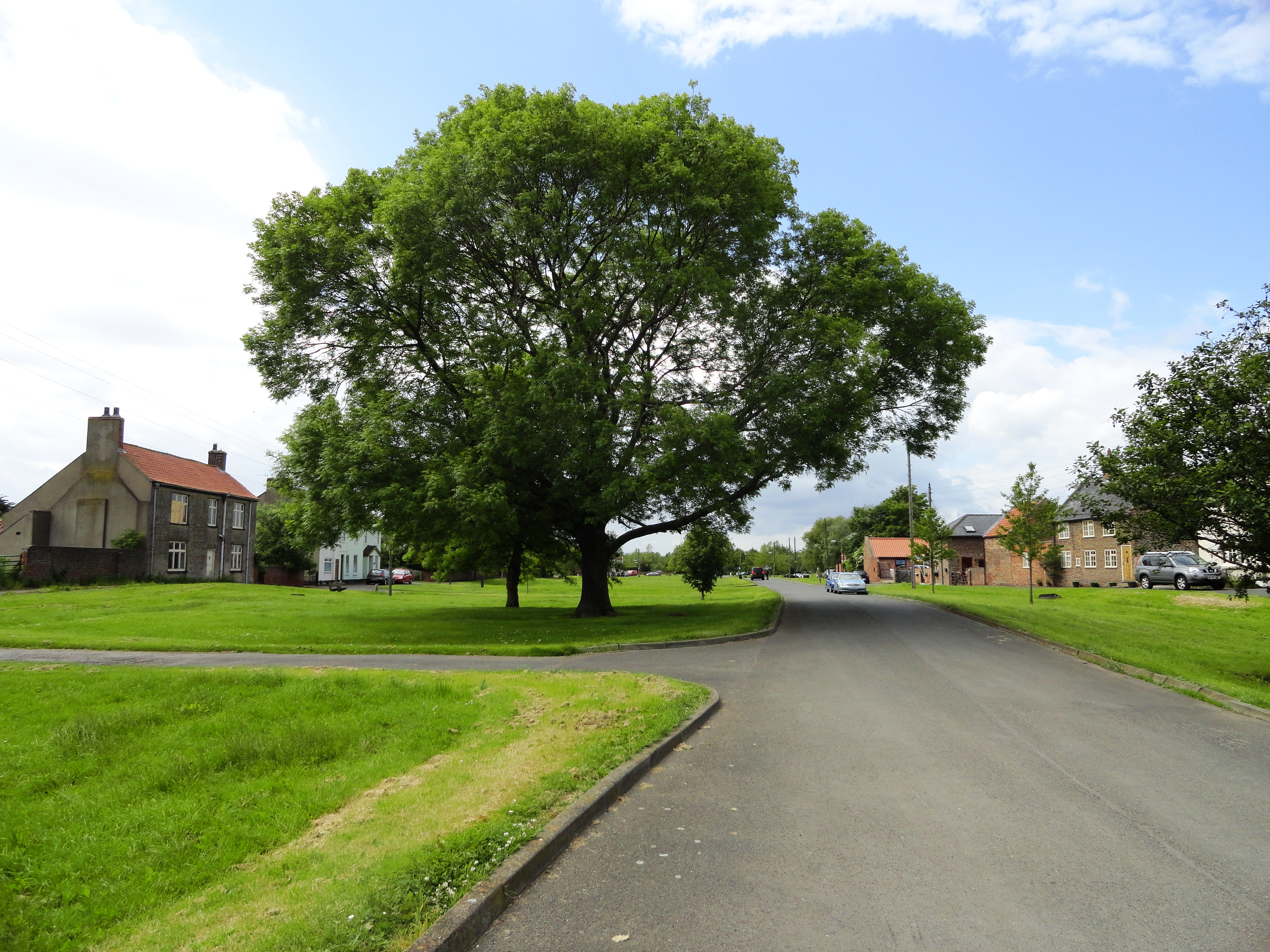
- The village green

- Location within County Durham
- OS grid reference: NZ482246
- Civil parish: Billingham
- Unitary authority: Stockton-on-Tees
- Ceremonial county: Durham
- Region: North East
- Country: England
- Sovereign state: United Kingdom
- Post town: BILLINGHAM
- Postcode district: TS23
- Police: Cleveland
- Fire: Cleveland
- Ambulance: North East
- UK Parliament: Stockton North

Cowpen Bewley is a village and former civil parish, now in the parish of Billingham, in the Stockton-on-Tees district, in the ceremonial county of Durham, England. In 1931 the parish had a population of 706.

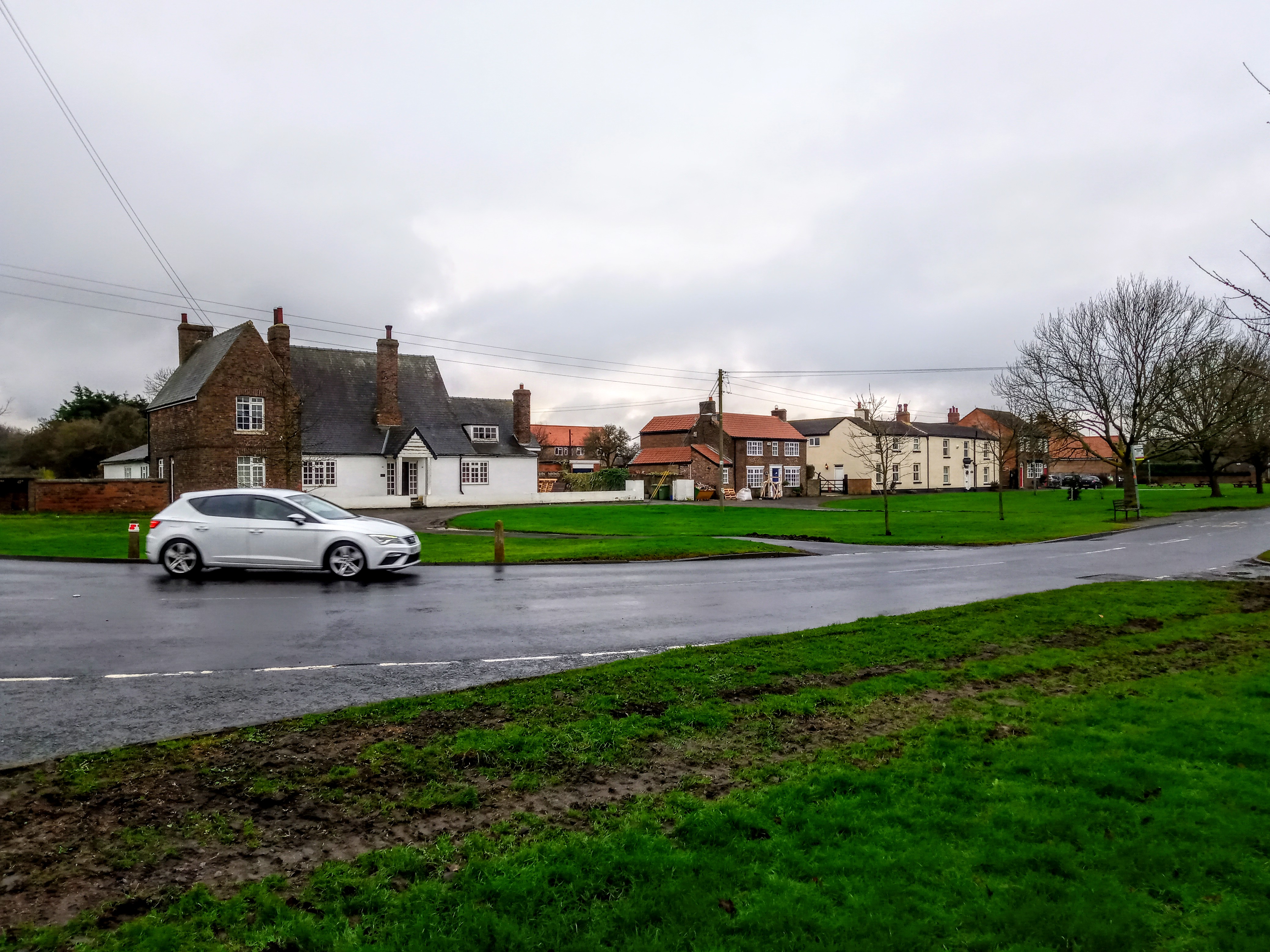
Cowpen Bewley, Billingham, County Durham.

== Civil parish ==
Cowpen-Bewley was formerly a township in the parish of Billingham, from 1866 Cowpen Bewley was a civil parish in its own right, on 1 April 1937 the parish was abolished and merged with Billingham and Newton Bewley.

== Economy ==
The only non-residential building in the village is a public house. It has a woodland park, the nearest school is St Michael's Academy and a light industry estate is to the south west.

== See also ==
- Newton Bewley in the borough of Hartlepool
- Faith Wood, a woodland in County Durham
