= Holy Rosary parish, Billingham =

Our Lady Of The Most Holy Rosary Parish, Billingham has been recently combined with two other parishes to create a new parish St. Thomas of Canterbury Billingha. so technically no longer exists. The new and old parishes are both located in the Roman Catholic Diocese of Hexham and Newcastle, and serve the town's Catholic community. The parish is served by the Parish Priest Rev J Butters and the Deacon Rev D McKie.

== History ==
Holy Rosary parish was established on 13 November 1949 and almost immediately a temporary church, known as "The Hut" was built, it was blessed in 1950. Soon funds became available to build a permanent church within the parish and Bishop James Cunningham laid the foundation stone on 16 May 1959. The church was opened on 22 September 1960. The church sanctuary was re-ordered in 1977, a permanent stone altar was brought forward, later the altar rails were removed and in 1984 a lectern and baptismal font were installed. In 1985 the parish celebrated the Silver Jubilee of the church building with week-long celebrations. The parish celebrated its Golden Jubilee in 1999. In 2009 the parish celebrated its Diamond Jubilee, with a Mass celebrated by the Bishop of Hexham & Newcastle Rt Rev. Seamus Cunningham.

Parish Clergy of Holy Rosary, Billingham
Name	Began Posting	Ended Posting
Fr. Eoghan Brady	1949	1958
Fr. James Marron	1954	1962
Fr. John Coyle	1957	1958
Fr. Lawrence Deegan	1958	1969
Fr. John Skivington	1960	1968
Fr. Patrick O'Connell	1968	1973
Fr. David Head	1969	1976
Fr. Seamus Doyle	1973	1983
Fr. Michael Keoghan	1976	1994
Fr. David Coxon	1983	1987
Fr. Michael Whalen	1987	1991
Fr. John Butters	1994	To Date
Rev. Dan McKie	2009	To Date
Fr. Lee Barrett	2009	2011

== Position, Structure & Hierarchy ==
The parish, now known as St. Thomas of Canterbury is led by Rev J Butters. It is in the Deanery of St. Peter (the 18th Deanery ) which comprises Stockton-on-Tees & Billingham, whose Dean is Rev. P McKenna. St. Peter's Deanery lies within the Episcopal Area of Cleveland & South Durham, whose Episcopal Vicar is Rev J Butters.

== Service Times ==
Service Times
Day	Time	Type
Sundays	10:00	Holy Mass
Holy Days	12:00	Holy Mass
Weekdays	As Printed	Holy Mass/Service Word & Communion

Confessions with Exposition of the Blessed of Sacrament Fridays 6-7pm.

== Statistics ==
Mass Attendance (as of 2008) 295, Number of Baptisms (2008) 11, Number of Marriages (2008) 1, Deaths (2008) 21.
