= Faith Wood =

- Location within County Durham
- Interactive map of Faith Wood

Geography
- Location: County Durham, England
- OS grid: NZ482258
- Coordinates: 54.625°N 1.254°W
- Area: 10.06 hectares (24.86 acres)

Administration
- Authority: Woodland Trust

Faith Wood is a woodland in County Durham, England, near the village of Cowpen Bewley. It covers a total area of 10.06 hectares (24.86 acres). It is owned and managed by the Woodland Trust.
