= Avecia =

Nitto Denko Avecia Inc.
- Formerly: Avecia Biotechnology Inc. (2001–2012)
- Company type: Subsidiary
- Industry: Biotechnology
- Defunct: 15 September 2015
- Headquarters: Milford, Massachusetts, U.S.
- Parent: Nitto Denko Corporation

Avecia, a part of Nitto Denko Inc., is a private biotechnology company focused on oligonucleotide production. Avecia has two facilities, one near Boston, MA, and the second in Cincinnati, OH.

In 2009, Avecia Biologics Limited based in Billingham, UK was acquired by Merck and was later part of Fujifilm Diosynth Biotechnologies.

In 2016, Avecia acquired the assets of Irvine Pharmaceutical Services and Avrio Biopharmaceuticals. Avecia was organized with a biologics business line and the oligonucleotide business line.
