= Fujifilm Diosynth Biotechnologies =

Biotech contract development and manufacturing organization

- Company type: Subsidiary
- Industry: Biotechnology
- Founded: 1923; 103 years ago
- Parent: Fujifilm
- Website: fujifilmdiosynth.com

FUJIFILM Diosynth Biotechnologies, abbreviated and often referred to as FDB, is a biopharmaceutical contract manufacturing organization that develops manufacturing processes and manufactures active ingredients and provides fill and finish services for pharmaceutical companies. FUJIFILM Diosynth Biotechnologies is the world's second largest contract manufacturer of biopharmaceuticals, with manufacturing facilities in Morrisville, North Carolina and College Station, Texas in the United States, Teesside, United Kingdom and Hillerød, Denmark in Europe, and recently added sites in Thousand Oaks, California and Watertown, Massachusetts. FUJIFILM Diosynth Biotechnologies operates a highly automated multipurpose manufacturing facility in College Station, Texas under the federal government's Center for Innovation in Advanced Development and Manufacturing (CIADM) program, which is the largest scale-out cell culture manufacturing facility in the United States.

== History ==
The company started in Oss, Netherlands in 1923 with the extraction of insulin from bovine pancreata, and porcine insulin extraction in 1930. In January 2005, the company became a part of Organon, one of its sister companies in the Akzo Nobel pharma group. Along with its sister companies Organon and Intervet were sold to Schering-Plough in March 2007 by Akzo Nobel. Following the mergers of Schering-Plough with Merck & Co. (MSD) on March 9, 2009, the company temporarily became part of the MSD Nutritionals products company, belonging to the MSD group. In 2009, MSD acquired the biologics business of the Avecia group, which consists of the Billingham, UK site. Combined, the Merck/MSD BioManufacturing Network was formed by the combination of Avecia Biologics and Diosynth Biotechnology offering contract manufacturing services.

In April 2011, the Merck BioManufacturing Network was sold to Fujifilm, forming Fujifilm Diosynth Biotechnologies. For most of the company's history, Diosynth manufactured biochemical substances and fine chemicals, with pharmaceutical raw materials coming largely from either animal origin or chemical intermediates. Under Fujifilm, it no longer focuses on small molecules, but instead develops processes for and mass manufactures biologics (e.g., proteins and mRNA). On December 18, 2014, Fujifilm Diosynth Biotechnologies acquired Kalon Biotherapeutic Technologies in College Station, TX, which became Fujifilm Diosynth Biotechnologies Texas. In 2019, Fujifilm acquired Biogen's Denmark manufacturing facility in Hillerød for $890 million.

In March 2020, Fujifilm Diosynth Biotechnologies named Martin Meeson the company's new CEO. He took over from Steve Bagshaw who was set to retire and became a non-executive chairman. In June 2023, Lars Petersen succeeded Martin Meeson as the new CEO.

Subject to regulatory approval, at least 60 million doses of the Novavax COVID-19 vaccine will be manufactured for the UK government from 2021 by Fujifilm Diosynth Biotechnologies at its Billingham site.

In March 2021, the company announced that it had selected Holly Springs, North Carolina, located near its existing operations in Morrisville, for a $2 billion investment to establish a new large-scale cell culture production site, which is expected to be operational in 2025 and create 725 new jobs by the end of 2028. The company plans to install 8 x 20,000L bioreactors at the facility and plan for the ability to add an additional 24 x 20,000L bioreactors, as well as production lines for large scale automated fill and finish, labeling, and packaging services.
