= St Michael's Catholic Academy, Billingham =

St Michael's Catholic Academy

Location
- Beamish Road; Billingham, County Durham, TS23 3DX; England; 54.613°N 1.270°W

Information
- Type: Academy
- Motto: Quis Ut Deus
- Religious affiliation: Roman Catholic
- Established: 1964
- Department for Education URN: 139656 Tables
- Ofsted: Reports
- Priest with Responsibility: Rev John Butters
- Head of School: Clare Humble
- Staff: 50
- Gender: Coeducational
- Age: 11 to 16
- Enrolment: 902 [as of 2017/18 term]
- Website: www.stmichaels.bhcet.org.uk

St Michael's Catholic Academy (formerly St Michael's Roman Catholic School) is a co-educational Roman Catholic secondary school with academy status, located in Billingham, the Borough of Stockton-on-Tees, England. The school converted to academy status on 2 September 2013 under the sponsorship of Bishop Hogarth Catholic Educational Trust. The headteacher of the school is Clare Humble.

St Michael's Catholic Academy was funded by the Government's Building Schools for the Future investment scheme, St. Michael's was then to be relocated to a site adjacent to Billingham Campus School in the second wave of funding from the programme. However, following the scrapping of the program in 2010, the relocation was cancelled. The new school building was opened in 2016, and the old school buildings have since been demolished.
