= The Wilson Family =

English folk music group

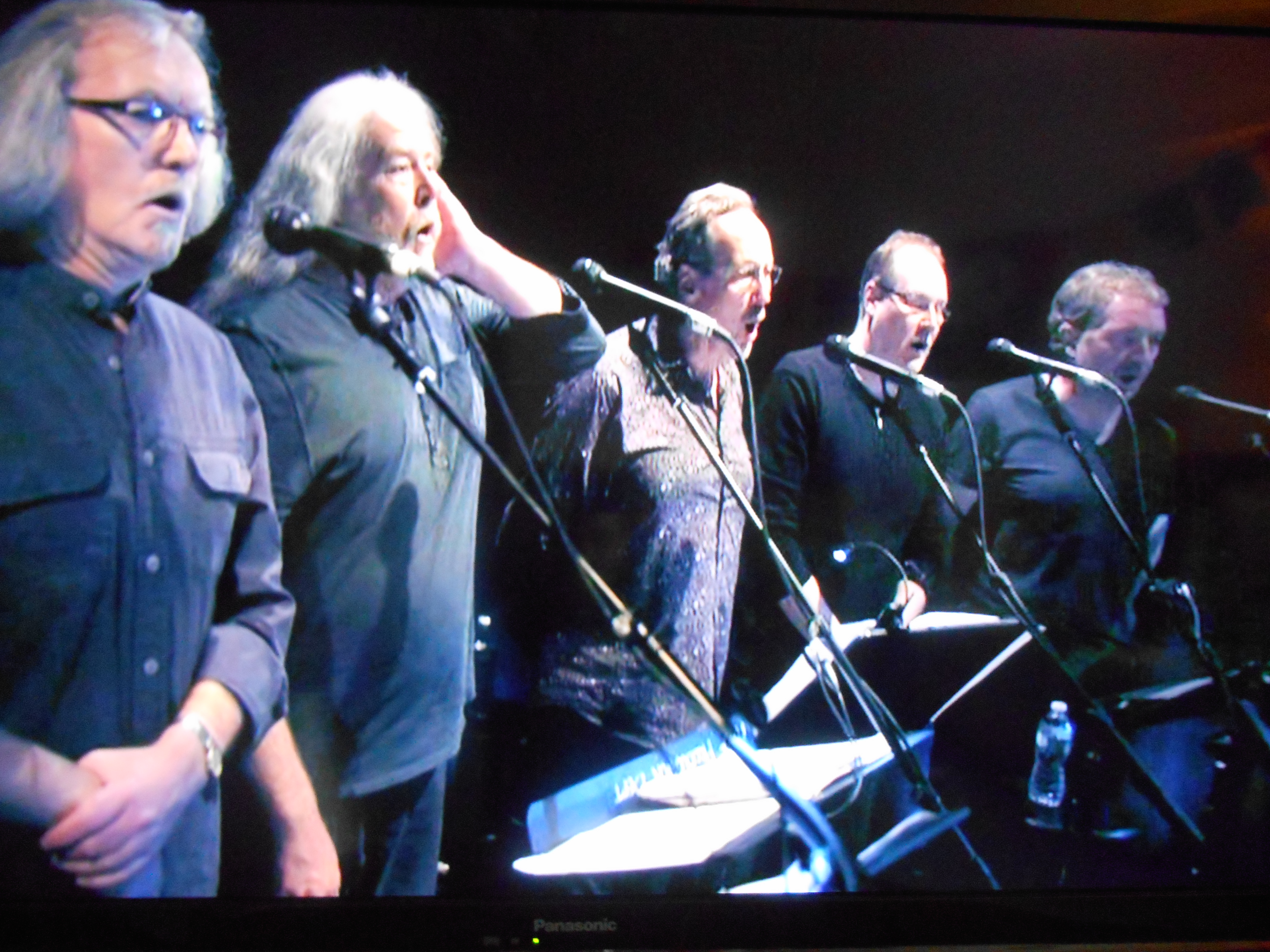
- The Wilson Family in concert with Sting, The Public Theater, New York City, October 2013

Background information
- Origin: Billingham, County Durham, England
- Genres: Folk
- Years active: 1974–present
- Members: Tom Wilson; Chris Wilson; Steve Wilson; Mike Wilson
- Past members: Pat Wilson, Ken Wilson
- Website: https://thewilsonfamilyfolkgroup.co.uk/

The Wilson Family is an English folk music group from Billingham, County Durham, North East England. They have been singing and performing a cappella folk songs since 1974. Over the years the group has consisted of sister Pat and five brothers: Tom, Chris, Steve, Ken and Mike, today the group are original core members Tom, Chris & Steve and youngest brother Mike.

The group's roots are founded in the folk clubs of the second British folk revival of the 1960s. They have released a number of recordings, included amongst them their acclaimed full debut album, Horumarye (1983), the first complete album of songs released by any folk artist, dedicated solely to the songwriting of Teesside songwriter, Graeme Miles, and the eponymous The Wilson Family Album released in 1991. In June 2023, they marked almost half a century of performing folk songs together, with the release of their latest studio album "Sibling Revivalry".

In addition to performing as a group, The Wilson Family promote and encourage the development of folk song, by continuing to host one of the longest established uninterrupted weekly Folk Club gatherings in the UK.

They continue to record and are a consistent major attraction at UK folk club/concert and festival venues.

== Projects ==
In August 2011 the Family sang at the BBC Proms, Royal Albert Hall, collaborating with the Northern Sinfonia, the BBC Singers and Kathryn Tickell. The group's contribution received universal acclaim across the UK music press.

In January and February 2013, they recorded with Sting songs for his play and album, The Last Ship, which was released on 23 September 2013. The Wilson Family then performed those songs with Sting at a series of 10 benefit concerts, held at the Public Theater, New York, in September and October 2013. The show was broadcast by BBC on 22 December 2013, and featured the group performing songs from The Last Ship stage show and an additional unaccompanied song from their own repertoire, a version of a Rudyard Kipling poem "Big Steamers", put to music by folk musician and friend of the Family, Peter Bellamy.

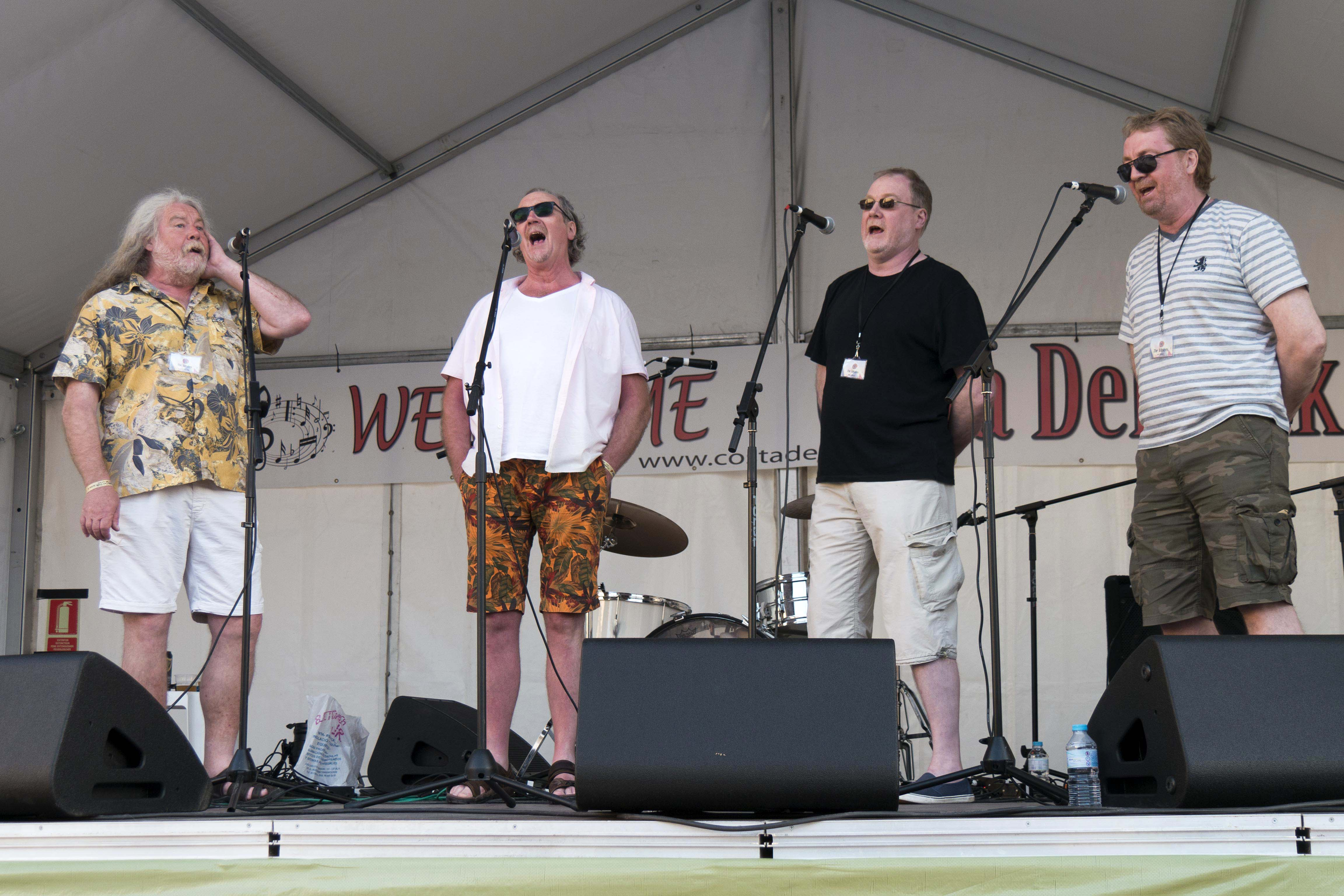
2016 photo

== EFDSS Gold Badge Award ==
In September 2017, The Wilson Family were awarded the Gold Badge of the English Folk Dance & Song Society (EFDSS). It is the highest honour that the society can bestow. The award was presented to the Group by Alistair Anderson, Chair of EFDSS, at the opening concert of the Hartlepool Folk Festival, of which The Wilson Family are Patrons, 13 October 2017.
