= Robert Shanks (footballer) =

English footballer

Personal information
- Full name: Robert Shanks
- Place of birth: Cowpen Bewley, County Durham, England
- Height: 5 ft 8 1/2 in (1.74 m)
- Position: Full-back

Senior career*
Years	Team	Apps	(Gls)
- Stockton
1926–1927	York City	13	(0)
1927–	Huddersfield Town	0	(0)
- Connah's Quay & Shotton
1929–1931	Exeter City	41	(1)
1931–	Stockport County	13	(1)
Total		67	(2)
- * Club domestic league appearances and goals

Robert Shanks was an English professional footballer who played as a full-back in the Football League for Exeter City and Stockport County, in non-League football for Stockton, York City and Connah's Quay & Shotton, and was on the books of Huddersfield Town without making a league appearance.
