= Billingham =

Town in County Durham, England

Coordinates: 54.61°N 1.27°W

- Town
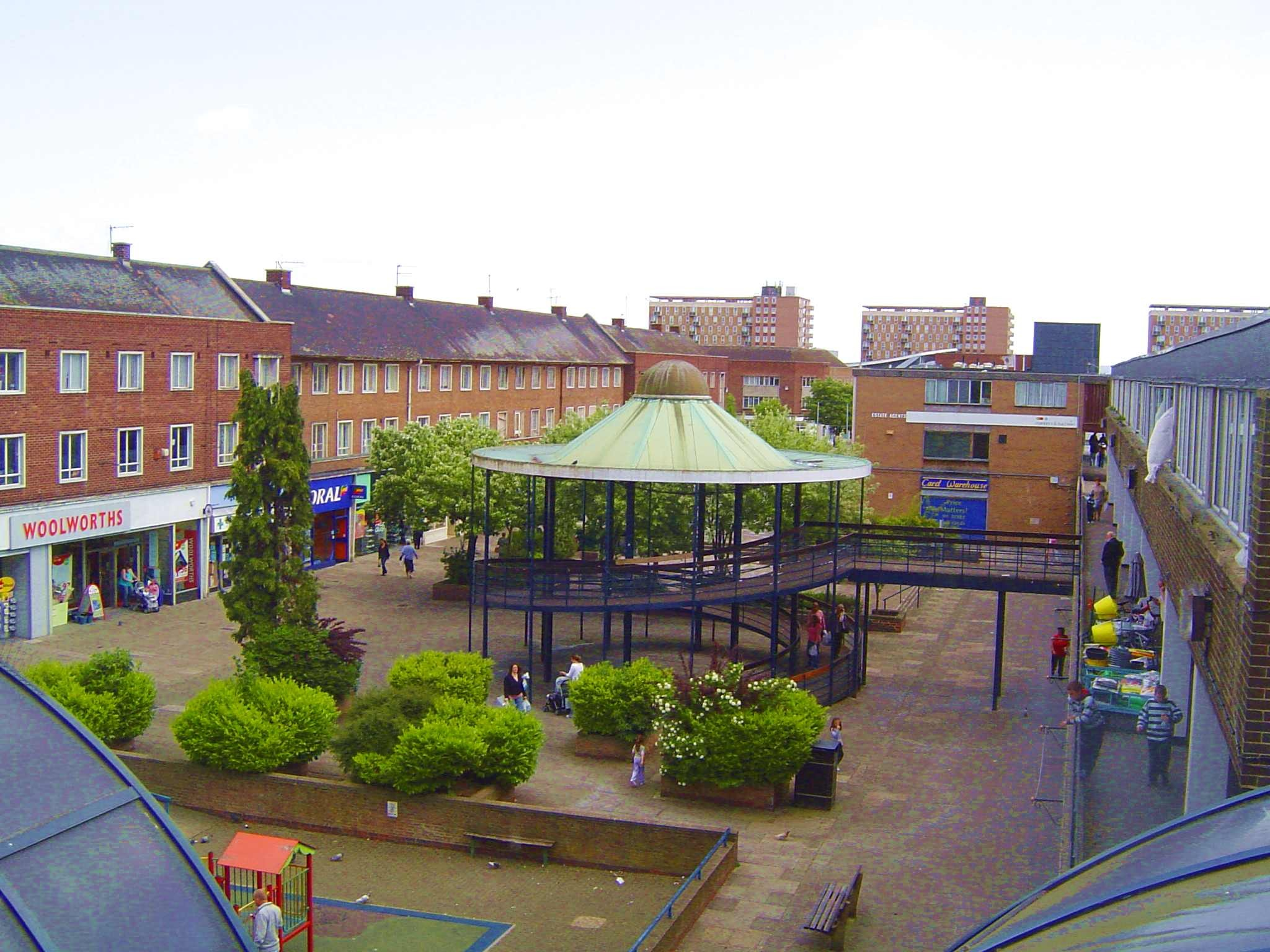
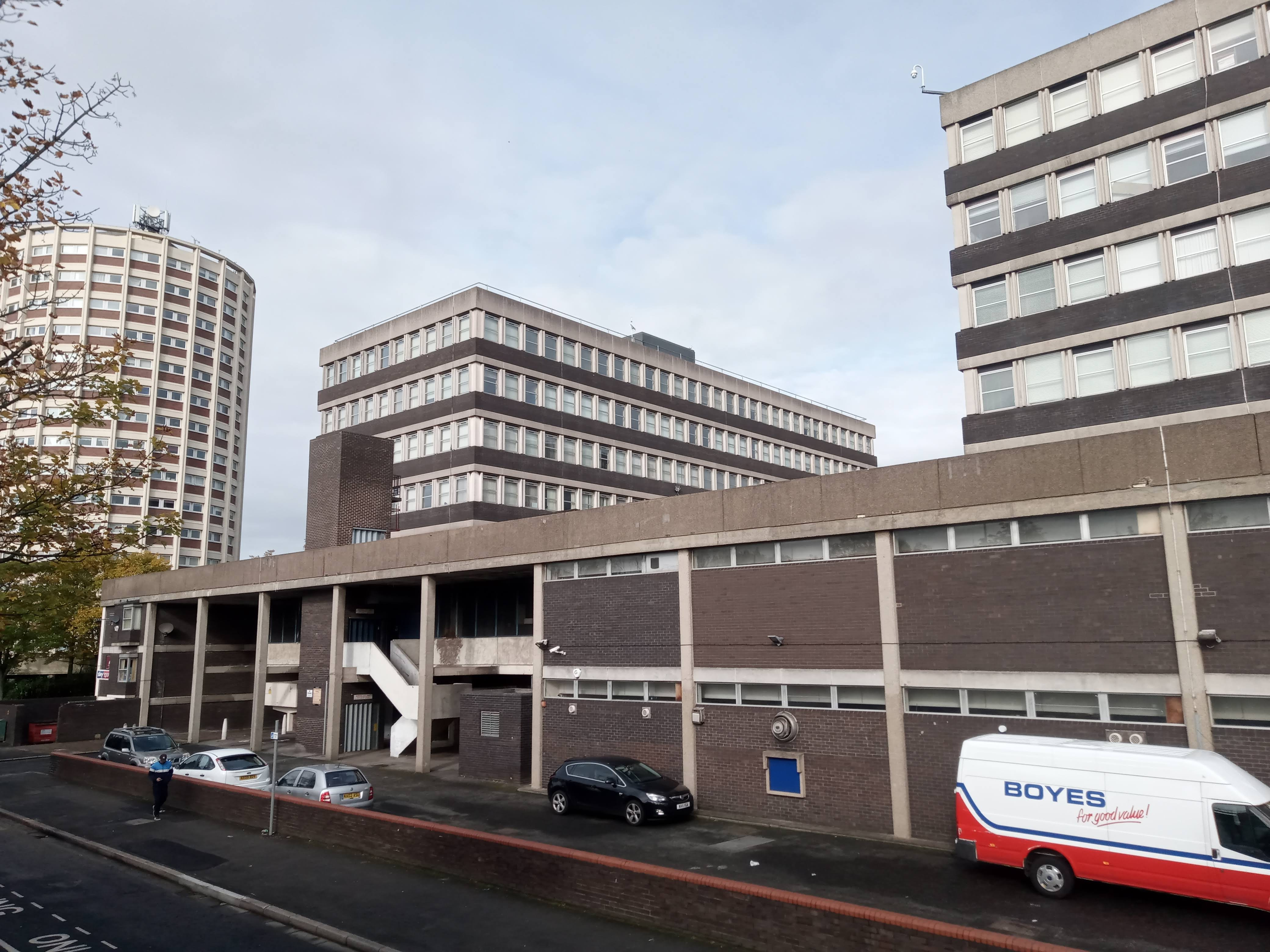
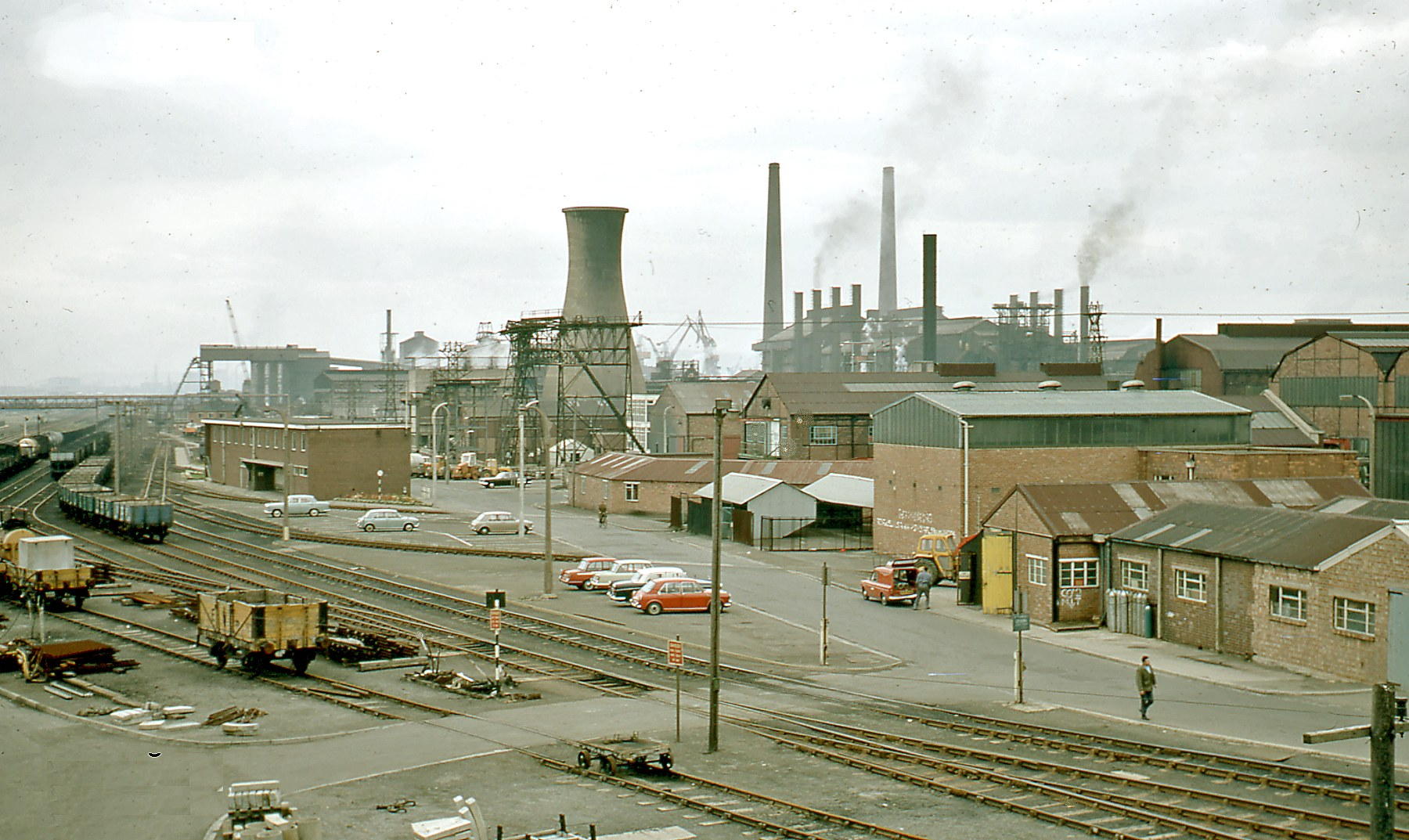
- From the top: the town centre; Kingsway; Billingham Manufacturing Plant

- Location within County Durham
- Population: 33,915 (2021 census)
- OS grid reference: NZ470240
  - London: 219 mi (352 km)
- Civil parish: Billingham
- Unitary authority: Stockton-on-Tees
- Ceremonial county: County Durham
- Region: North East
- Country: England
- Sovereign state: United Kingdom
- Post town: BILLINGHAM
- Postcode district: TS22, TS23
- Dialling code: 01642
- Police: Cleveland
- Fire: Cleveland
- Ambulance: North East
- UK Parliament: Stockton North
- Website: www.billingham-tc.gov.uk

Billingham is a town and civil parish in County Durham, England. The town is on the north side of the River Tees and is governed as part of the Borough of Stockton-on-Tees unitary authority. It had a population of 33,927, in the 2021 census.

The settlement has existed since Anglo-Saxon times as a village. A post-Second World War town centre was built north of the old village centre on the town's grange. It was a township, with an urban district, from 1923, until 1968, when it was absorbed into the County Borough of Teesside, and later part of the county of Cleveland.

Billingham is home to the Billingham Manufacturing Plant which is a major producer of chemicals for agriculture.

== History ==
The town was settled by Angles and has a name either meaning Billa's people's home or bill-shaped hill people's home. The town was in one of the Northumbrian regiones. This regione is thought to cover much of the land of northern Teesdale and had late Viking rule. It was later broken up with Billingham in the Hartness district, then into a small shire called Billinghamshire.

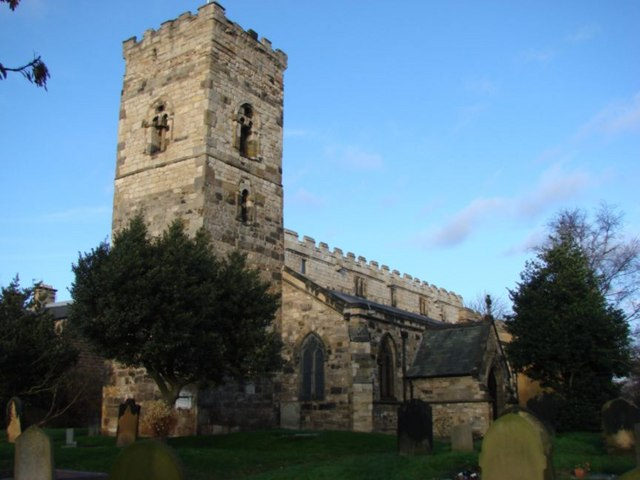
St Cuthbert's Church

St Cuthbert's Parish Church has elements dating back to the late-7th/early-8th-century in its nave and a tower dating c. AD 1000. There is also a 7th-century grave-marker from the church in the British Museum.

=== Chemical industry and ICI ===
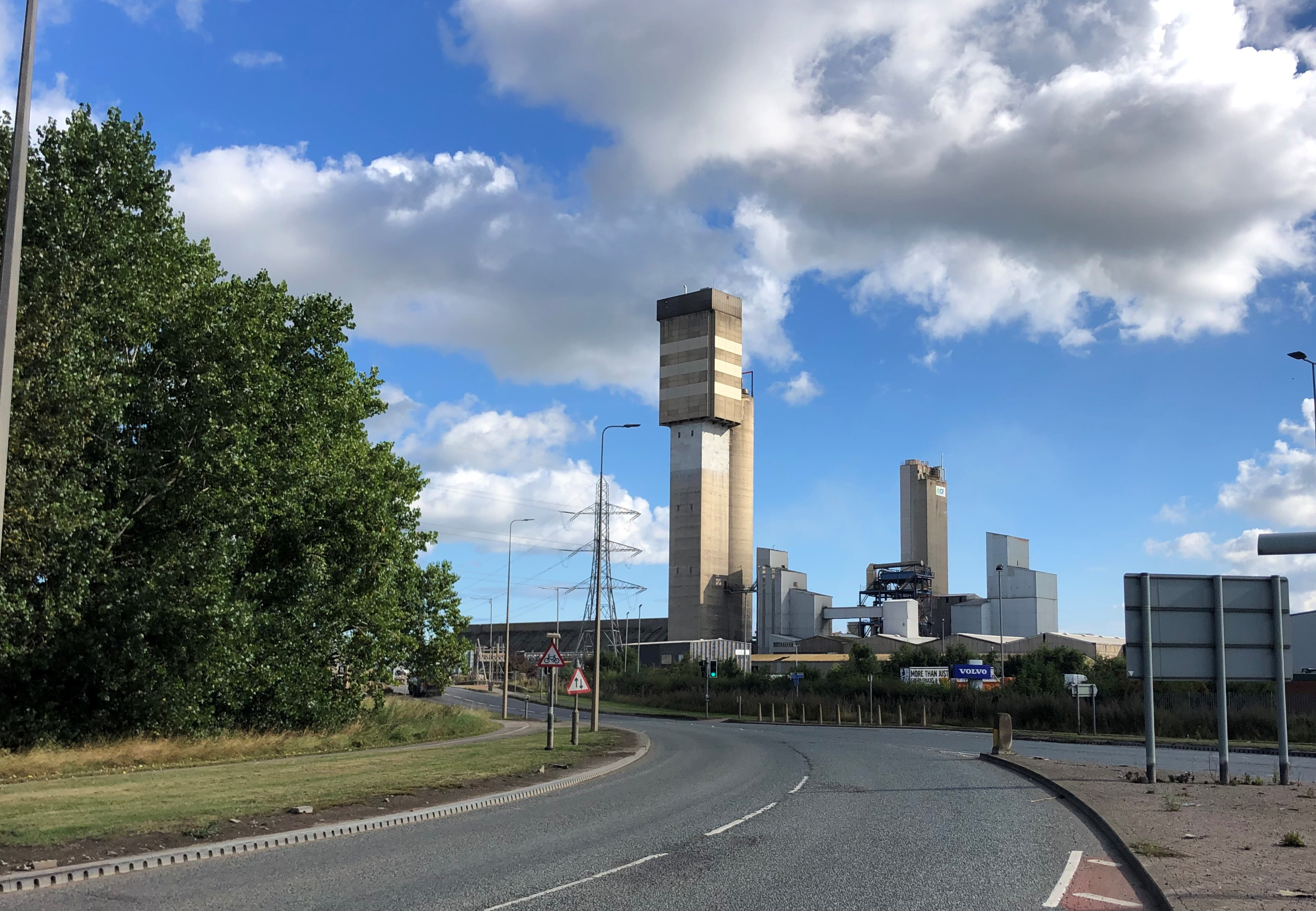
Fertiliser chemical works

The town's chemical industry started in the early 1900s. In 1917, the town was chosen to be the site of a new chemical works supplying ammonia for the war. However, the plant was not completed until 1920, after the war had ended. The Brunner Mond Company took over the site and converted it to manufacture fertilisers. In December 1926, Brunner Mond merged with three other chemical companies to form Imperial Chemical Industries (ICI), who took control of the plant. With the World Wars creating a high demand for explosives it led to a massive expansion of Billingham and post-Second World War a new town centre was built. ICI began to produce plastics at Billingham in 1966.

Aldous Huxley visited the newly opened and technologically advanced Brunner and Mond plant at ICI and gave a detailed account of the processes he saw. The introduction to the most recent print of Brave New World states that Huxley was inspired to write the novel by this Billingham visit. Henry Thorold in the Shell Guide to County Durham states:

This is one of the most extraordinary of experiences, a sight almost unique in England. On either side of the road are the works. Steaming, sizzling—tall steel towers, great cylinders, pipes everywhere... At night the whole industrial world along the banks of the Tees comes to life... brilliant with a thousand lights, the great girders of the Transporter Bridge dark in silhouette: a magic city.

From 1971 to 1988, ICI operated a small General Atomics TRIGA Mark I nuclear reactor at its Billingham factory to produce radio-isotopes for use in process instrumentation such as level measurement devices. In addition to its own on-site coal-fired power station, ICI also operated the coal-fired North Tees Power Station, designed by Giles Gilbert Scott, on the banks of the Tees to provide electricity for its plants. The latter was eventually decommissioned and demolished (at a ceremony attended by Environment Secretary Nicholas Ridley) in 1987. The site of the power station is now Billingham Reach Industrial Estate, an international wharf owned by Able UK Ltd. ICI no longer operates in Billingham, having sold many of its businesses during the restructuring of the company in the 1990s. Some of the company's former manufacturing plants are still in operation, run by other chemical companies. Several chemical plants close to the town were subject to explosions and leaks in 2006 and 2007.

Following the fragmentation and ultimate loss of the chemicals conglomerate ICI, the Billingham Chemical Industrial park became a multi-company facility. The chemical, biotechnology and engineering companies that continue to operate at Billingham are members of the Northeast of England Process Industry Cluster (NEPIC). They include GrowHow, Johnson Matthey, Fujifilm Diosynth Biotechnologies and Fruitarom. Other members of the NEPIC Cluster operate from the 62-acre (25 hectares) Belasis Business Park in Billingham such as Cambridge Research Biochemicals, ABB and Biochemica. Growhow not only manufacture fertilisers & industrial chemicals in Bilingham, but also capture the CO_{2} for use in the food and drink industry. Tomatoes are grown in Billingham by North Bank Growers using the recoverable energy from the Billingham complex, which further reduces the area's carbon footprint.

Fujifilm Diosynth Biotechnologies have a pharmaceutical manufacturing facility in Billingham. Subject to regulatory approval, at least 60 million doses of the Novavax COVID-19 vaccine will be manufactured there for the UK government from 2021.

=== Anhydrite mine ===
In 1983, NIREX announced a proposal to use the disused anhydrite mine as a site for the disposal of intermediate level nuclear waste. There was a certain amount of opposition to this, led by Billingham Against Nuclear Dumping (BAND), as despite the suitability of the site in geological terms, it was very close to a large population centre. Subsequently, in 1985, the plans were dropped. In 2007, more recent plans to reopen the mines for "use as a long-term disposal facility for low hazard waste" were met with similar opposition and a petition of 3,200 signatures against the mine's opening was presented to the local authority.

In March 2011, Stockton Council's planning committee accepted an application from NPL Waste Management to reopen the mine for the disposal of hazardous waste. NPL planned to convert the mine into a 4,000,000 cubic metre waste storage facility receiving over 100,000 tonnes of waste annually.

== Governance ==
=== Municipal ===
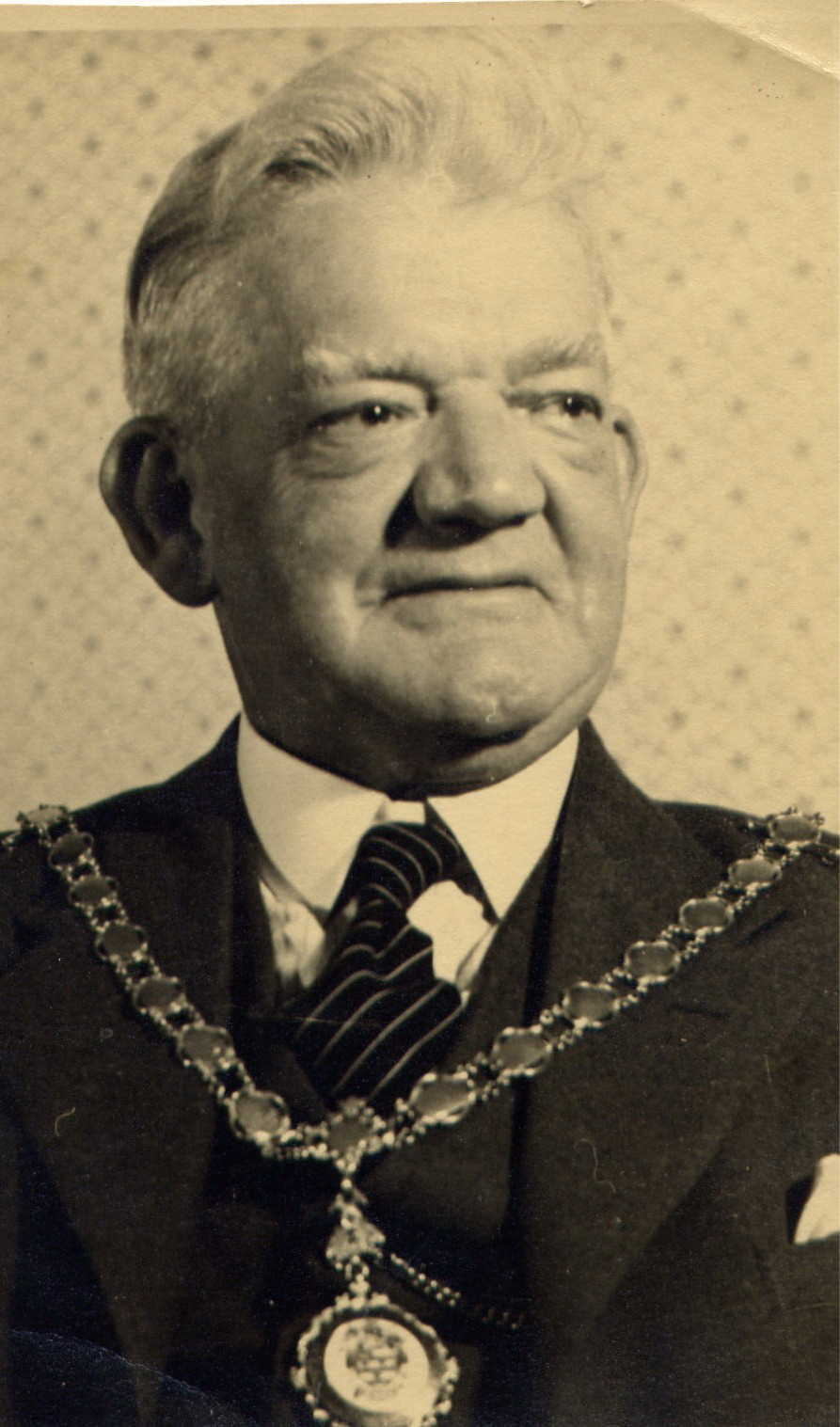
Octavious Evitts, the last mayor of Billingham (in 1952) before the civil parish was recreated

Between 1923 and 1968, Billingham had its own urban district council which built, among other things, the Billingham Forum, Kennedy Gardens and Billingham Golf Club (the UK's first municipally owned club). Billingham's last mayor was Octavious Evitts in 1952.

It was subsumed into the County Borough of Teesside in 1968. In 1974, Teesside County Borough was replaced by the County of Cleveland, which had four districts: Hartlepool, Langbaurgh-on-Tees, Middlesbrough and Stockton-on-Tees. Billingham was then part of Stockton-on-Tees. In 1996, with the abolition of Cleveland county, Billingham remained within the Borough of Stockton-on-Tees which became a unitary authority.

=== Town parish ===
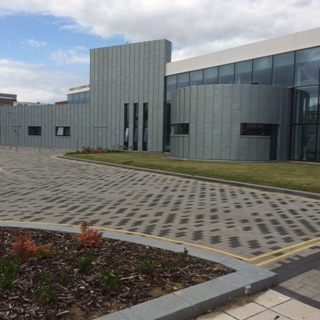
Billingham Library, the parish meeting point

Billingham civil parish is the largest area and size in the Stockton Borough. Other than the town itself, areas of the parish include Haverton Hill, Port Clarence, Cowpen Bewley and Seal Sands.

A petition to Stockton Borough Council and referendum held in 2003 both gave assent to a proposal for Billingham to become reparished. The Department for Communities and Local Government and the Electoral Commission issued orders for the creation of a Billingham parish and the setting up of a new town council in February 2007. It is funded by a precept of £80,000. The first elections for the new Town Council were held on 3 May 2007.

== Geography ==
=== Protected and green spaces ===
Billingham Beck Valley Country Park (also known as Billingham Bottoms) was landscaped from a reclaimed industrial waste tip and has steadily grown to include former grazing land to form a 120-acre (0.49 km^{2}) site including wetland habitats. Designated as a Local Nature Reserve by English Nature in 1992, it won a Green Flag Award in 2005. The beck itself is one of the major tributaries of the River Tees and has a tidal reach around the former ICI site.

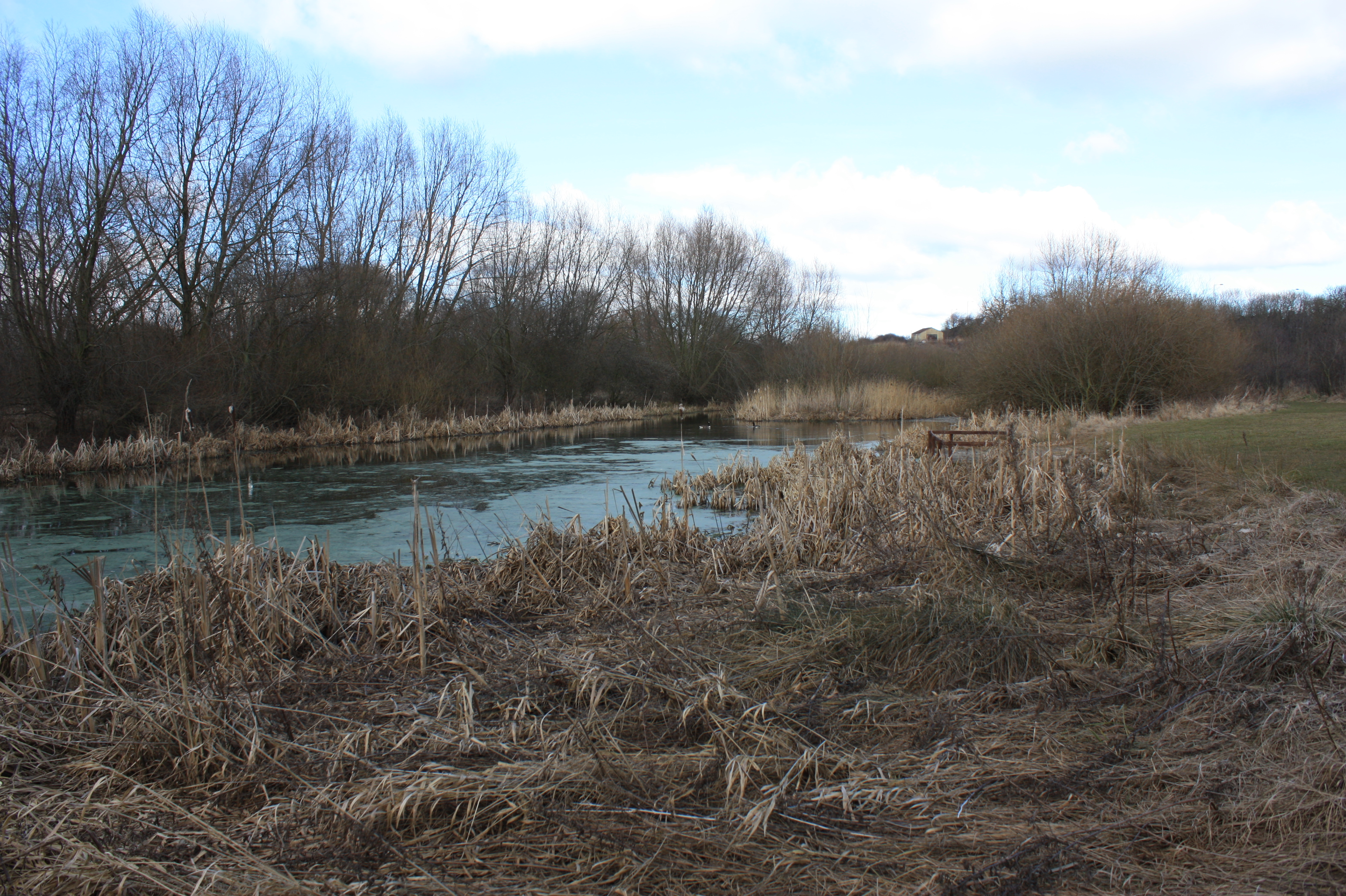
Billingham Bottoms

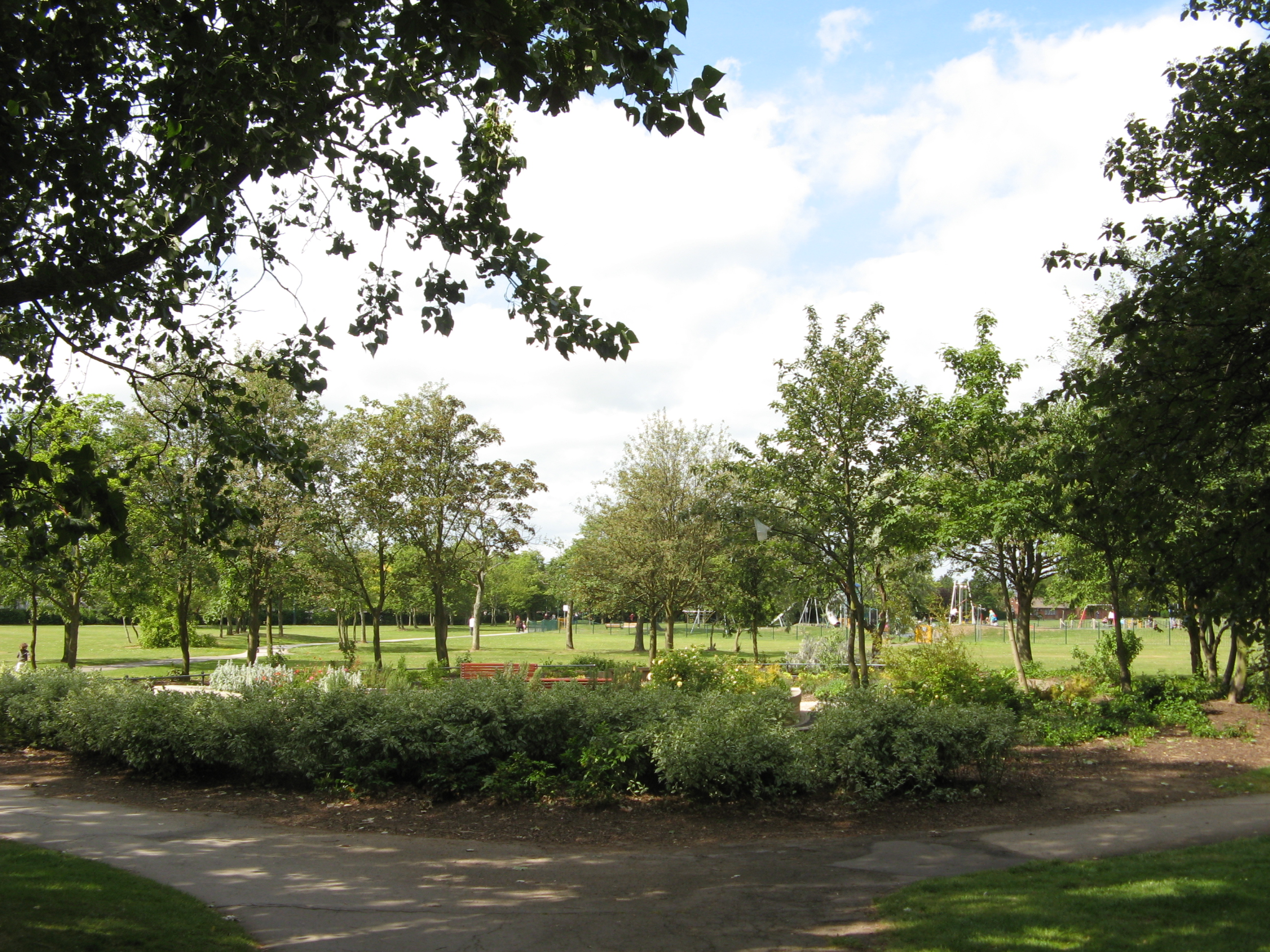
John Whitehead Park

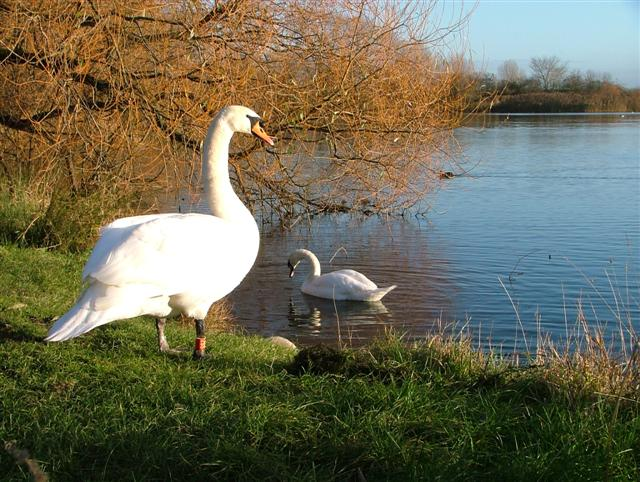
Charlton's Pond

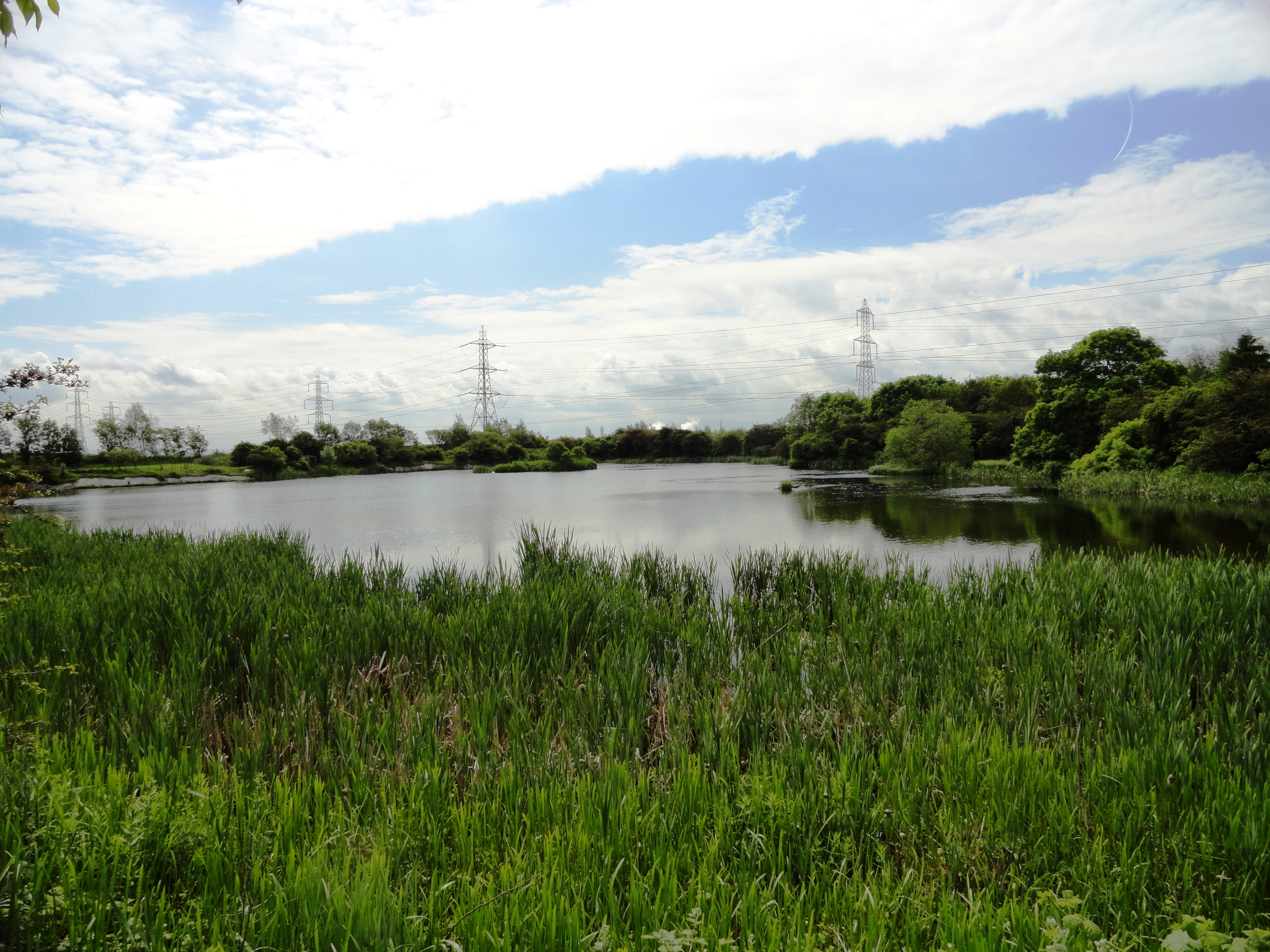
Cowpen Bewley Country Park

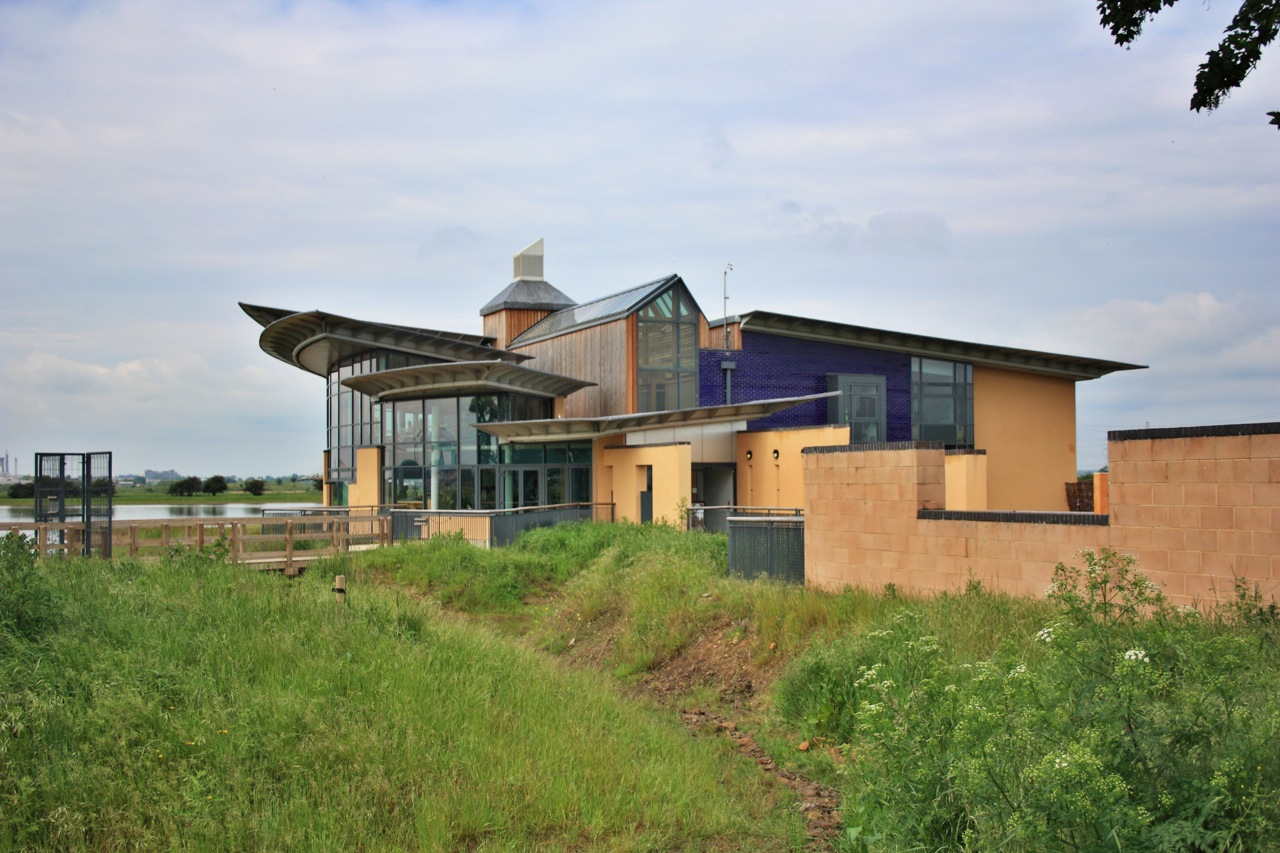
RSPB Saltholme

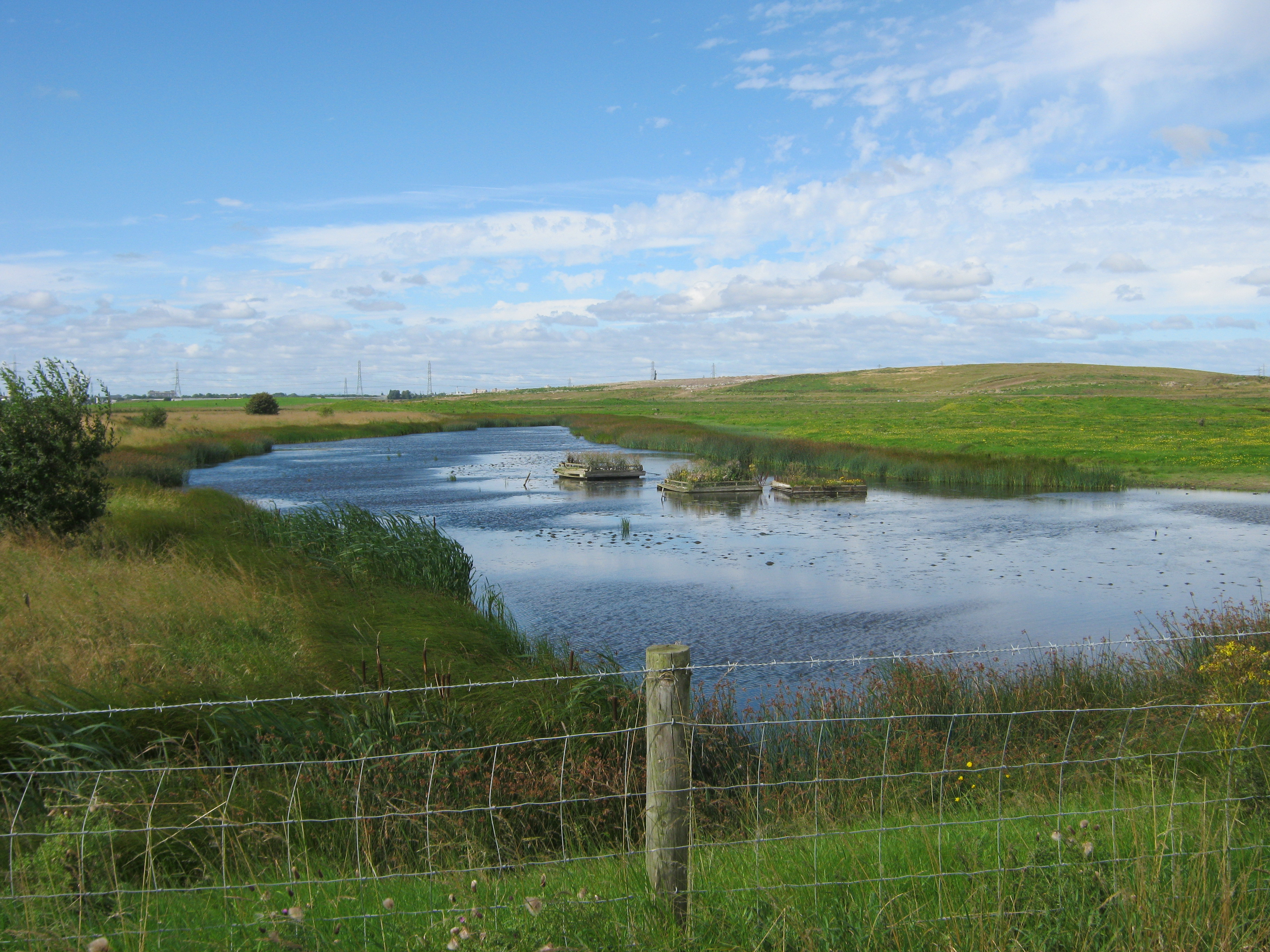
Cowpen Marsh at Seal Sands

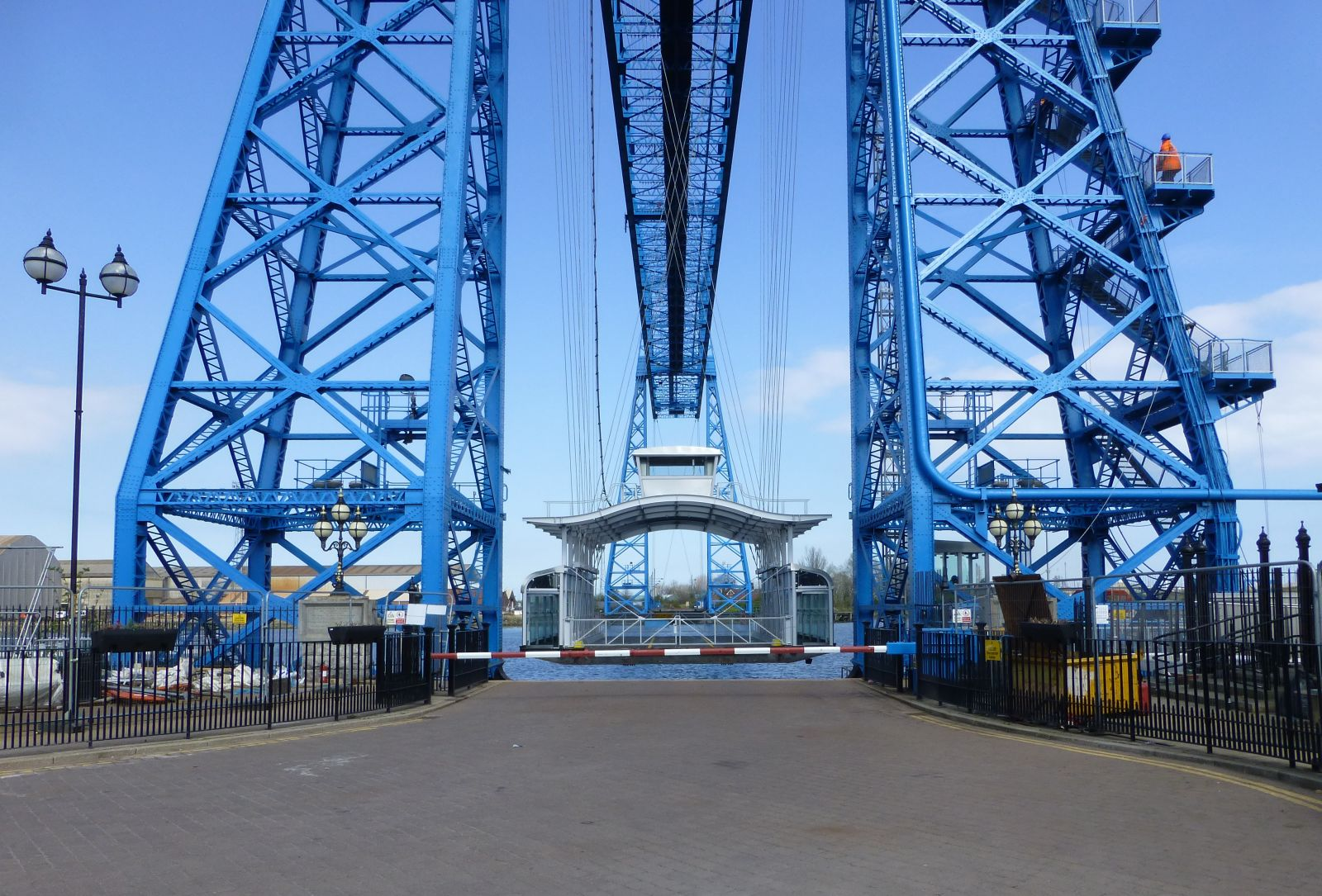
The Transporter Bridge

=== Town ===
The town is effectively split into two separate areas by name: Old Billingham (the area around the village green adjacent to St Cuthbert's church and built up around the ICI works) and the more planned estates that have spread out since the 1950s, increasing the town's size and borders towards the villages of Wolviston and Cowpen Bewley to the point of almost incorporating them.

Billingham Town Centre provides the town with national retail chains as well as several charity shops, estate agents and banks, with a market featuring in the centre every Monday and Friday. The town centre lacks some services but Stockton town centre is less than 3 miles (4.8 km) away and Middlesbrough town centre is also less than 3 miles (4.8 km) away.

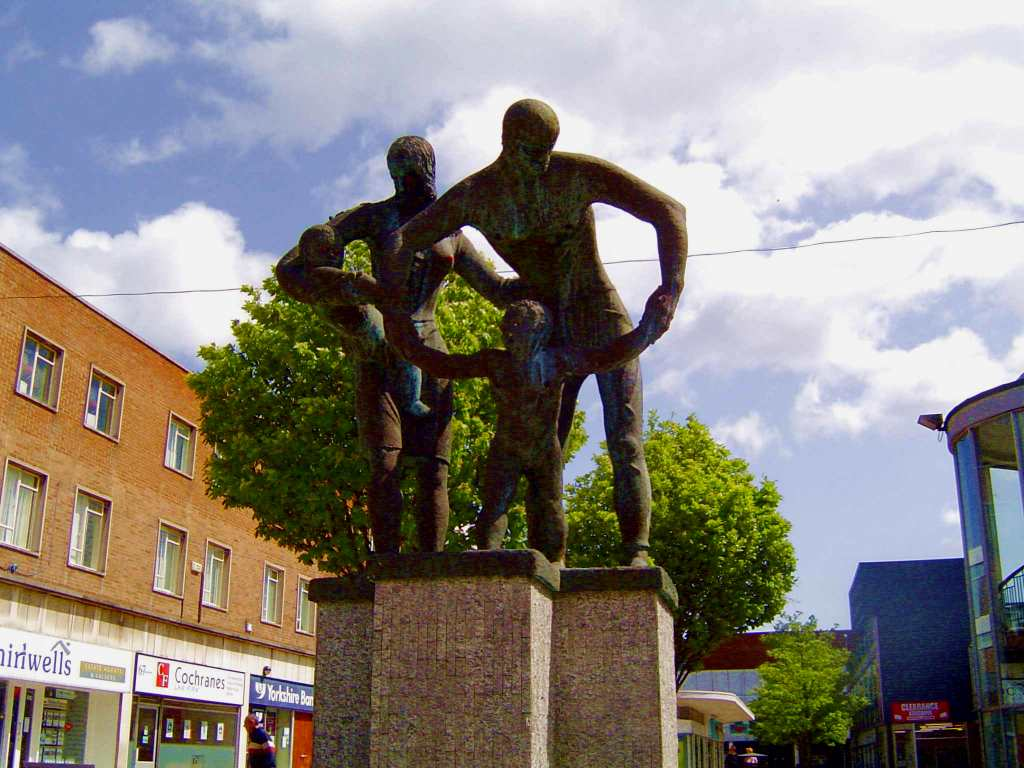
Town centre statue

In 1967, Associated Dairies' fledgling stores division, launched in 1965, opened its first store outside of its Yorkshire heartland in the town centre. Asda Billingham was Asda'a first store to open in the North East and is now the oldest continuously trading Asda supermarket in the UK.

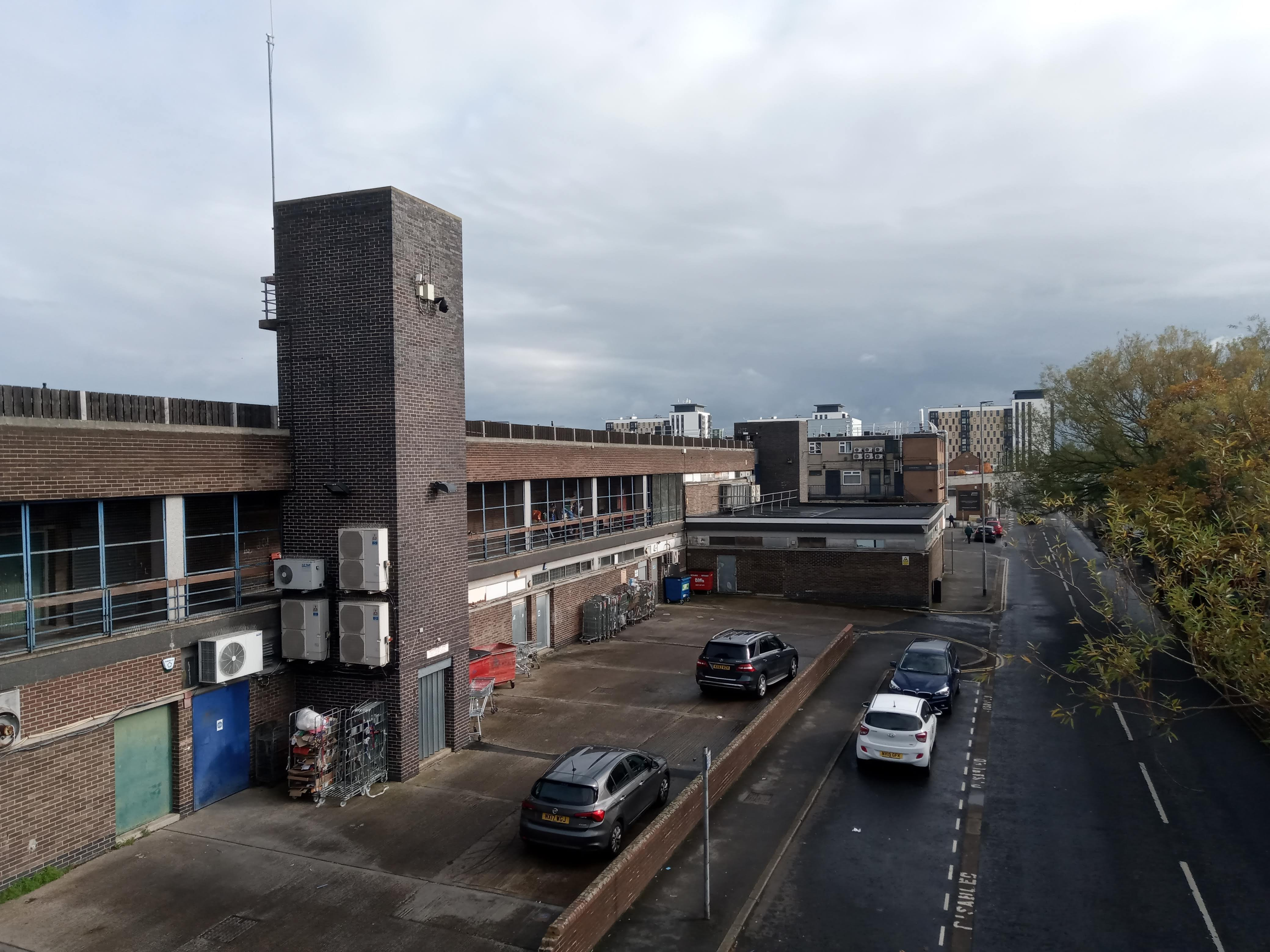
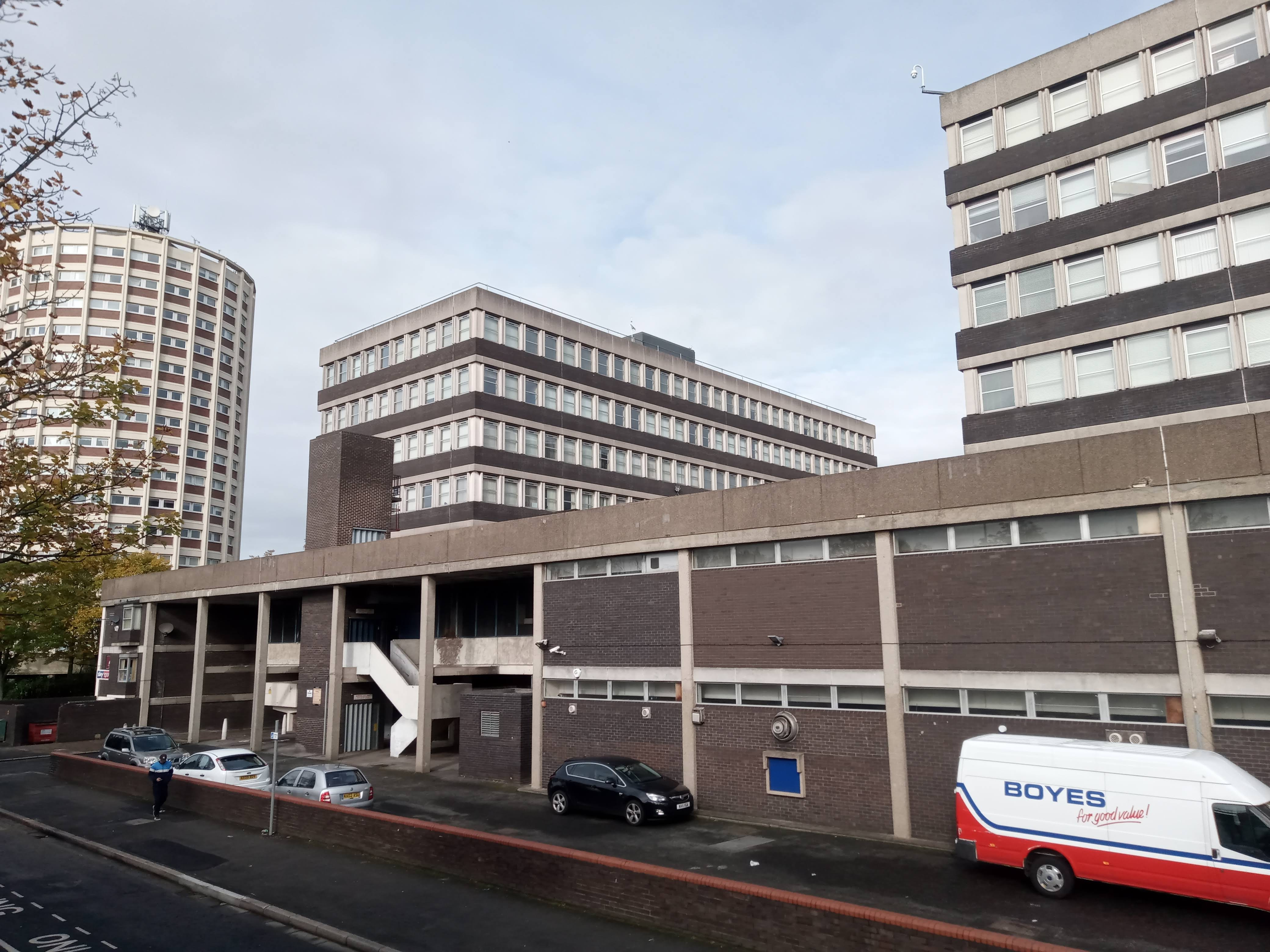
Kingsway, looking east and west

In March 2012 it was confirmed that a Wetherspoons public house would be opened in the town centre, along with a Fulton Frozen Foods superstore.

In August each year the town centre hosts the Billingham International Folklore Festival. Dancers and musicians perform traditional and contemporary dance.

In November 2013, a time capsule was buried in front of 'The Family' statue in Billingham town centre under a stone with the inscription 'FOREVER FORWARD 30 11 2013'. The capsule is not to be unearthed until the year 2078.

== Demography ==
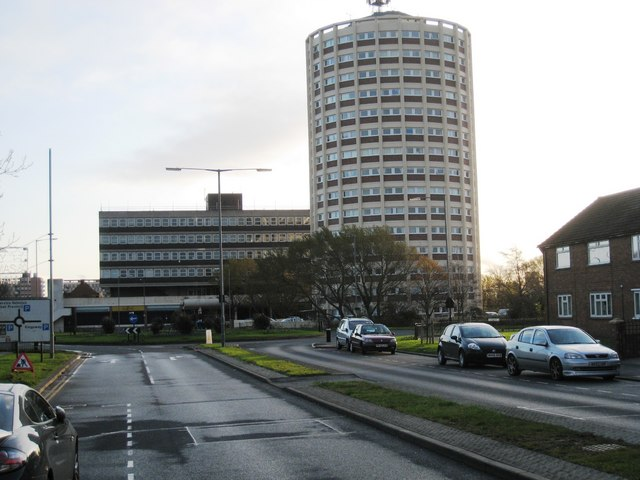
High-rise flats in Billingham

The population of Billingham, according to the census of 1801, was 962. This number increased slowly until the beginning of the First World War, when the need for nitrates to use in explosives brought about a significant burst of growth for the town. In 1917, after Billingham was chosen as the site for the production of synthetic ammonia due to its good transport links and access to the resources needed, the population of the town nearly doubled in just a few years from 4500 to 8000. After the war, the site was bought by Brunner Mond and converted for use in the production of agricultural fertiliser. Brunner Mond soon merged with a number of other companies to form Imperial Chemical Industries. This furthered the growth of Billingham's population, which reached nearly 18,000 by 1931. With the onset of the Second World War, synthetic ammonia for explosives was once again in demand, further sustaining the town's development.

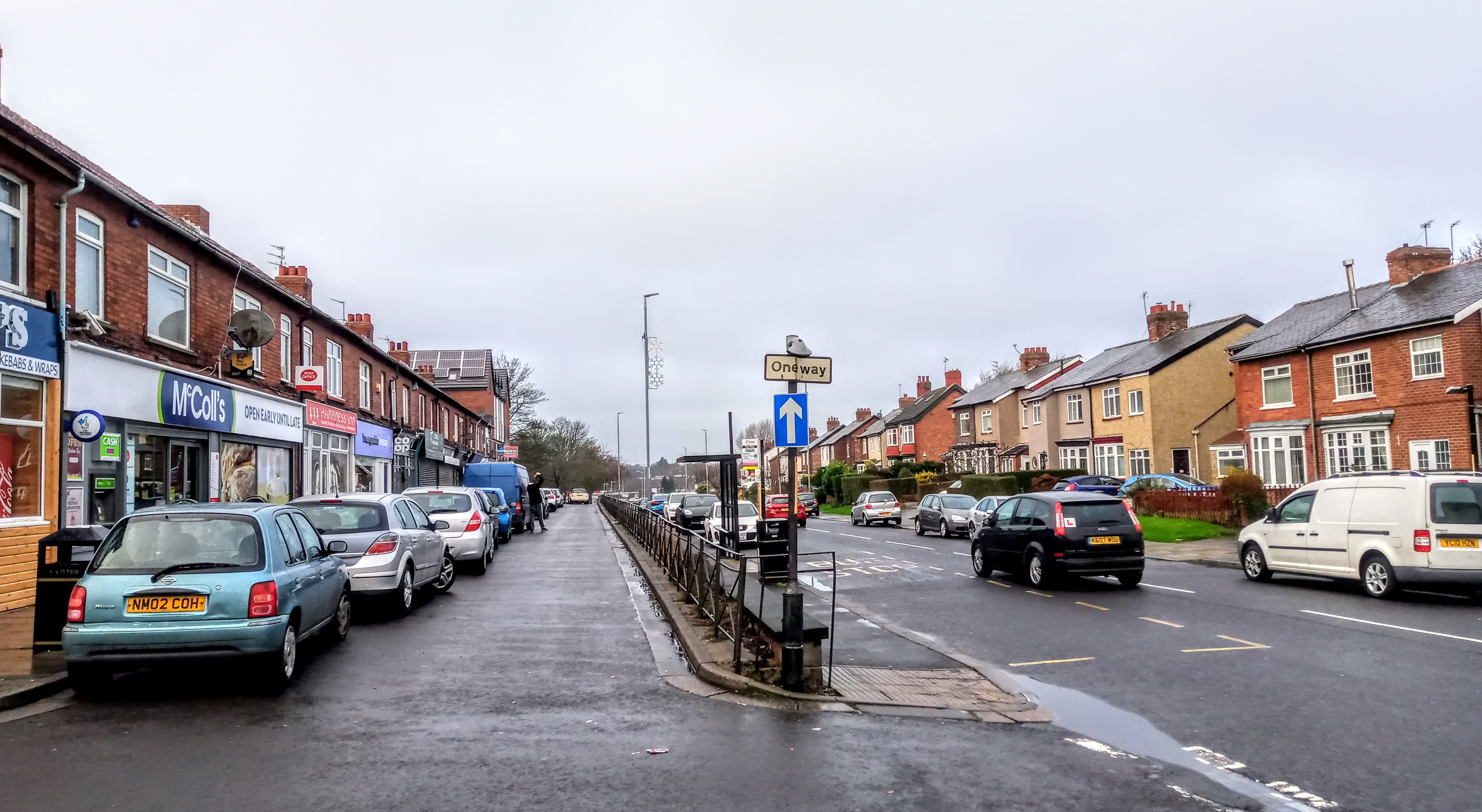
Shopping parade at Station Road, Billingham, County Durham

During the latter half of the 20th century, the population of Billingham slowed significantly due to the industrial decline of the area. Furthermore, Billingham attracted relatively few immigrants after its de-industrialisation. Across the wards that make up Billingham, just 2.3% of the population at the 2011 Census were born outside the UK, compared to a national average of 13%. The population was also recorded as 99% white.

Population data for 1801–1971 is available at Britain Through Time.

Population of Billingham
Year	1801	1811	1821	1831	1841	1851	1861	1871	1881	1891
Population	962	940	1154	1212	1652	1811	n/a	n/a	1488	2675
Year	1901	1911	1921	1931	1941	1951	1961	1971	1981	1991
Population	3729	4463	8058	17972	n/a	23993	32139	n/a	n/a	n/a
Year	2001									
Population	35765									

== Education ==
Billingham is served by two secondary schools: Northfield School, a specialist sports college, and St Michael's Catholic Academy, a specialist Science Catholic academy. Northfield Marsh House site, formerly Campus, was closed in 2012.

Bede College has served the town for several years, and attracts students from Hartlepool and Stockton, consistently achieving higher results than nearby colleges in Stockton or Middlesbrough. Formerly one of the smallest colleges in the UK, with under 400 students, its recent amalgamation with Stockton Riverside College and relocation to an adjacent new campus has seen its student body increase significantly. As part of the new campus, the college has also gained its own sports facilities.

== Religion ==
Billingham is home to several religious communities, the largest of which are the Church of England and the Roman Catholic Church.

The Church of England community is served by a single Team Parish, with five parish churches: St. Cuthbert's, St. Luke's, St. Mary Magdalene, St. Aidan's, and St. Peter's. The parish covers all of Billingham, the Clarences, Cowpen Bewley, Newton Bewley, and Wolviston. It is part of the Church of England Deanery of Stockton in the Archdeaconry of Auckland, which itself is within the Diocese of Durham.

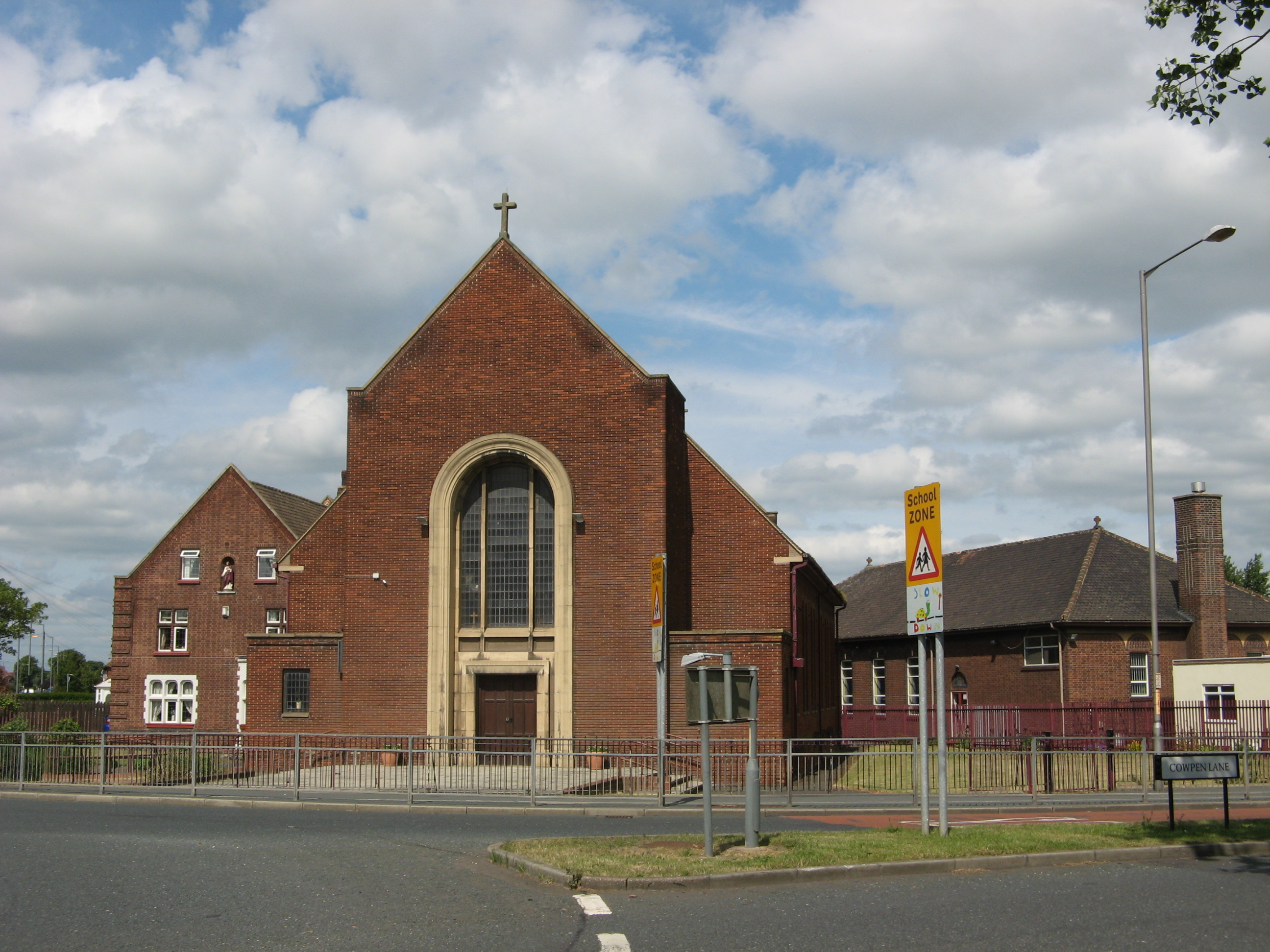
St John the Evangelist Church

The Roman Catholic community is served by three parishes, Our Lady of the Most Holy Rosary Parish Billingham, St. John the Evangelist and St. Joseph's. These parishes are based in Hexham and Newcastle's St Hilda Partnership. There is also St Michaels RC Secondary School in Billingham, which is part of the Carmel Trust based in Darlington.

The Christian community is also served by two Methodist churches, one Baptist church and a Pentecostal Church called "New Life" based on Low Grange Avenue. There is also a Church of Jesus Christ of Latter-Day Saints and a Kingdom Hall of Jehovah's Witnesses.

The Spiritualist community is served by one Spiritualist Church located on Chapel Road, TS23 1DX, just off The Green. This is the second oldest Church in Billingham and started out life as a Methodist church that was then sold on to the Spiritualist National Union when the Methodists needed a larger premises. The chapel has been serving Spiritualism and the local community since 1932.

== Transport ==
=== Road ===
Billingham is served by the A19 running to Sunderland in the north and Thirsk in the south.

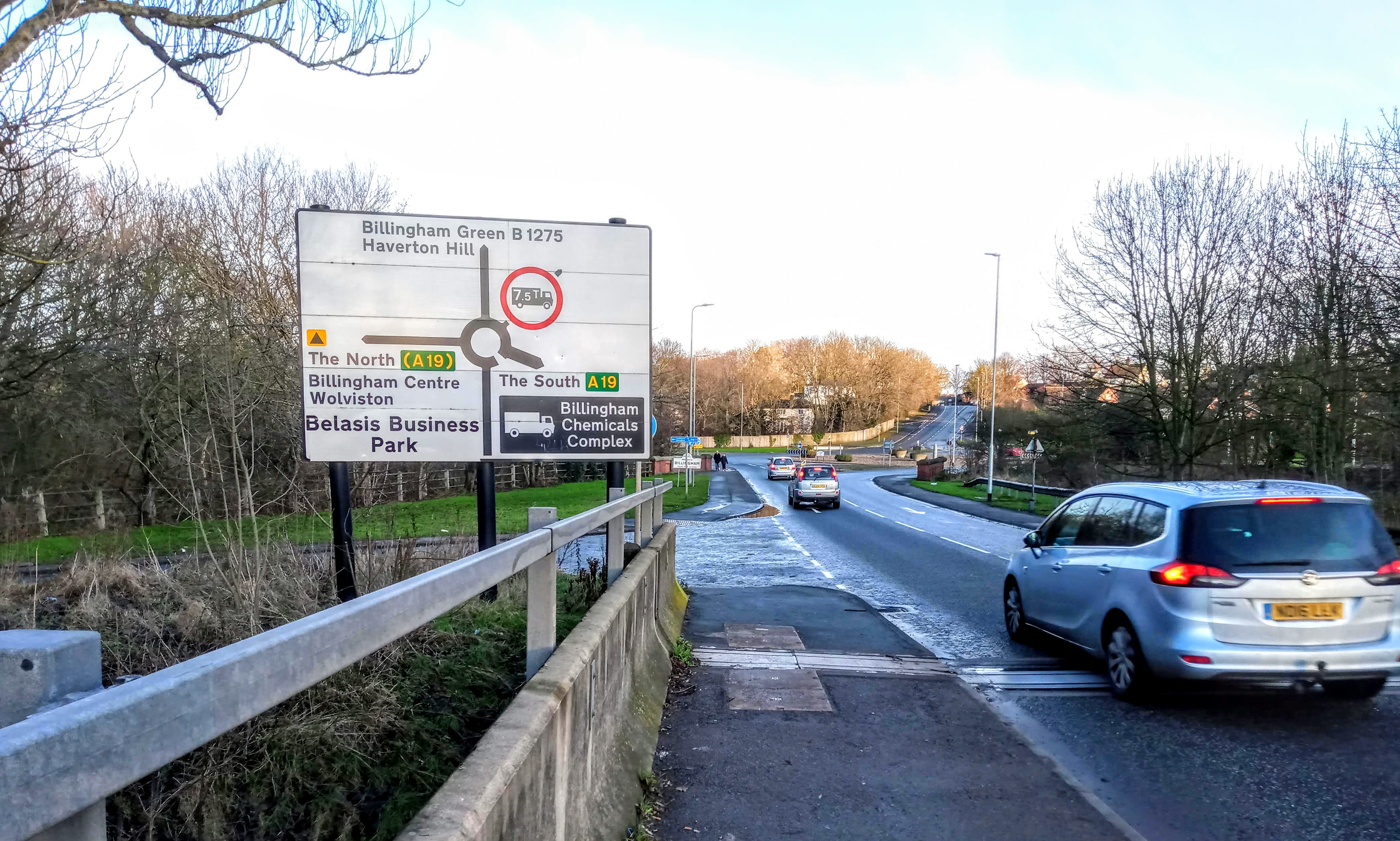
A139 entering Billingham Bottoms from Norton

Billingham is also served by the A689 to Hartlepool in the east and Bishop Auckland in the west.

=== Rail ===
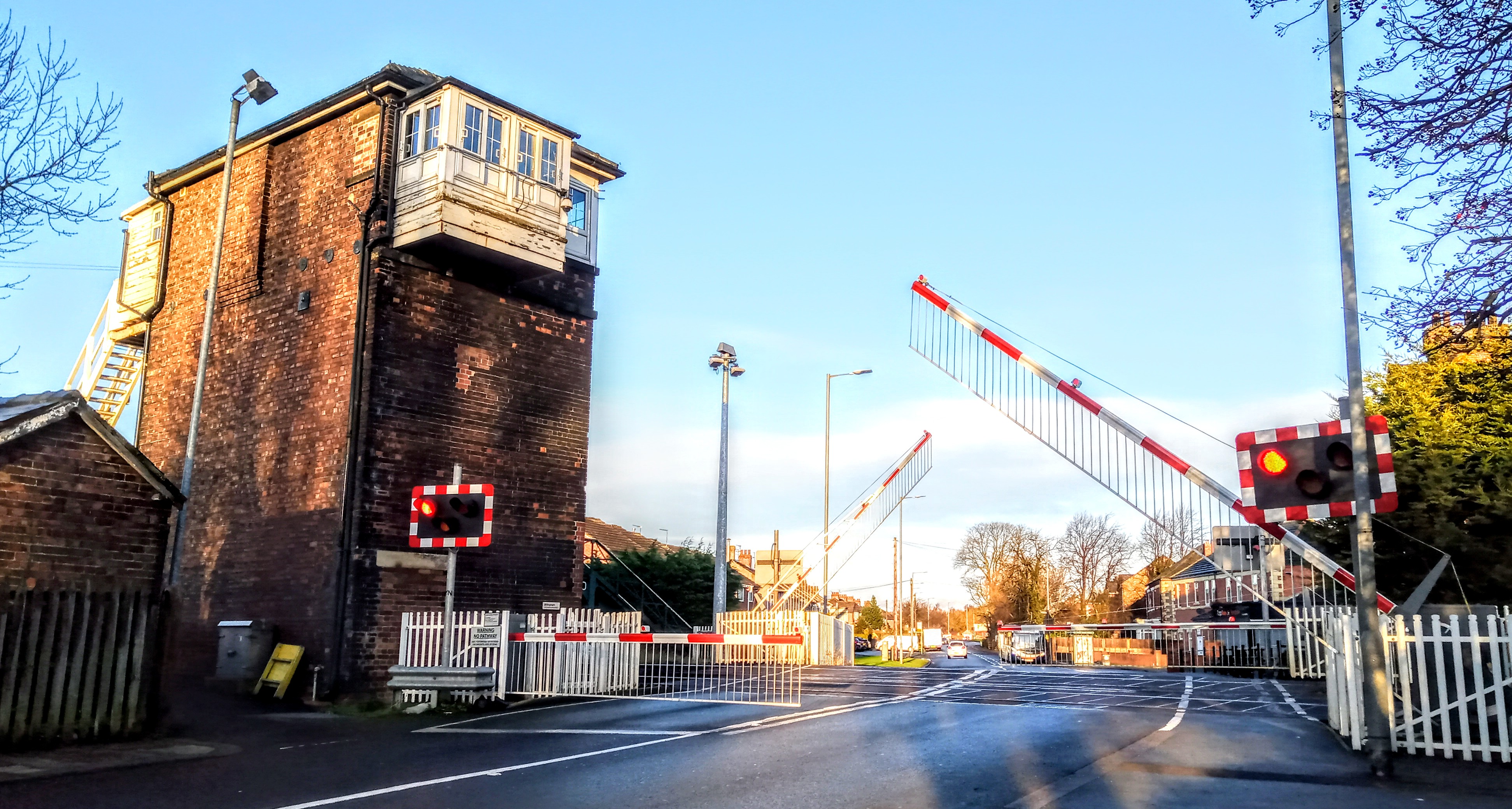
Level Crossing, Station Road

Billingham railway station is on the Durham Coast Line with hourly services provided by Northern to Newcastle and the MetroCentre in the north and to Stockton and Middlesbrough in the south. Grand Central provide an express train from Sunderland to London but the service does not currently serve Billingham.

The original Billingham railway station was closed in the late 1960s and moved a mile east along the line. Rail services were operated using Pacer trains which were in essence converted Leyland National buses, but these were withdrawn in late 2019 due to them not meeting government disability requirements.

=== Bus ===
Stagecoach provides services Stockton, Middlesbrough, Hartlepool, and Owington Farm. Go North East provide a service To Newcastle and Middlesbrough.

== Sport ==
Billingham is the home of Billingham Town F.C., who celebrated their 50th anniversary in 2017 having been initially founded in 1967 as Billingham Social Club.

The chemical industry's creation of ammonia in the town also led to the formation of Billingham's other football team, Billingham Synthonia, Synthonia being a portmanteau of synthetic ammonia and the name given to synthetic ammonia produced at the Billingham chemical plant. At the beginning of the 2017–18 season, financial difficulties spurred Billingham Synthonia F.C. to relocate to the Norton Sports Complex in Norton in a ground-share with Norton & Stockton Ancients and are currently ground sharing with Stokesley SC.

Billingham Synthonia Cricket Club is of similar origins to the football club of the same name. The club play in the North Yorkshire and South Durham Cricket League.

Ice hockey team, the Billingham Stars compete in the English National Ice Hockey League, and is based at the Billingham Forum Ice Arena. There is also another ice hockey team called the Billingham Wildcats which is made up of women aged 16+.

The town has one Rugby Union club, Billingham RUFC, which has four senior teams, the 1st XV currently playing in National 2 North, three leagues from the Premiership. The 2nd XV (Lions) currently playing in The "Candy League" Division 1. The 3rd XV currently playing in The "Candy League" Division 2, with the Colts playing in a competitive Saturday Colts League. The club also has a junior section, ranging from U-7 minis to U-16s, with teams winning Durham county cups and leagues.

Billingham RUFC has produced two players for England, Christopher Hyndman, u21s England and Adam Radwan, England.

=== Billingham Forum ===
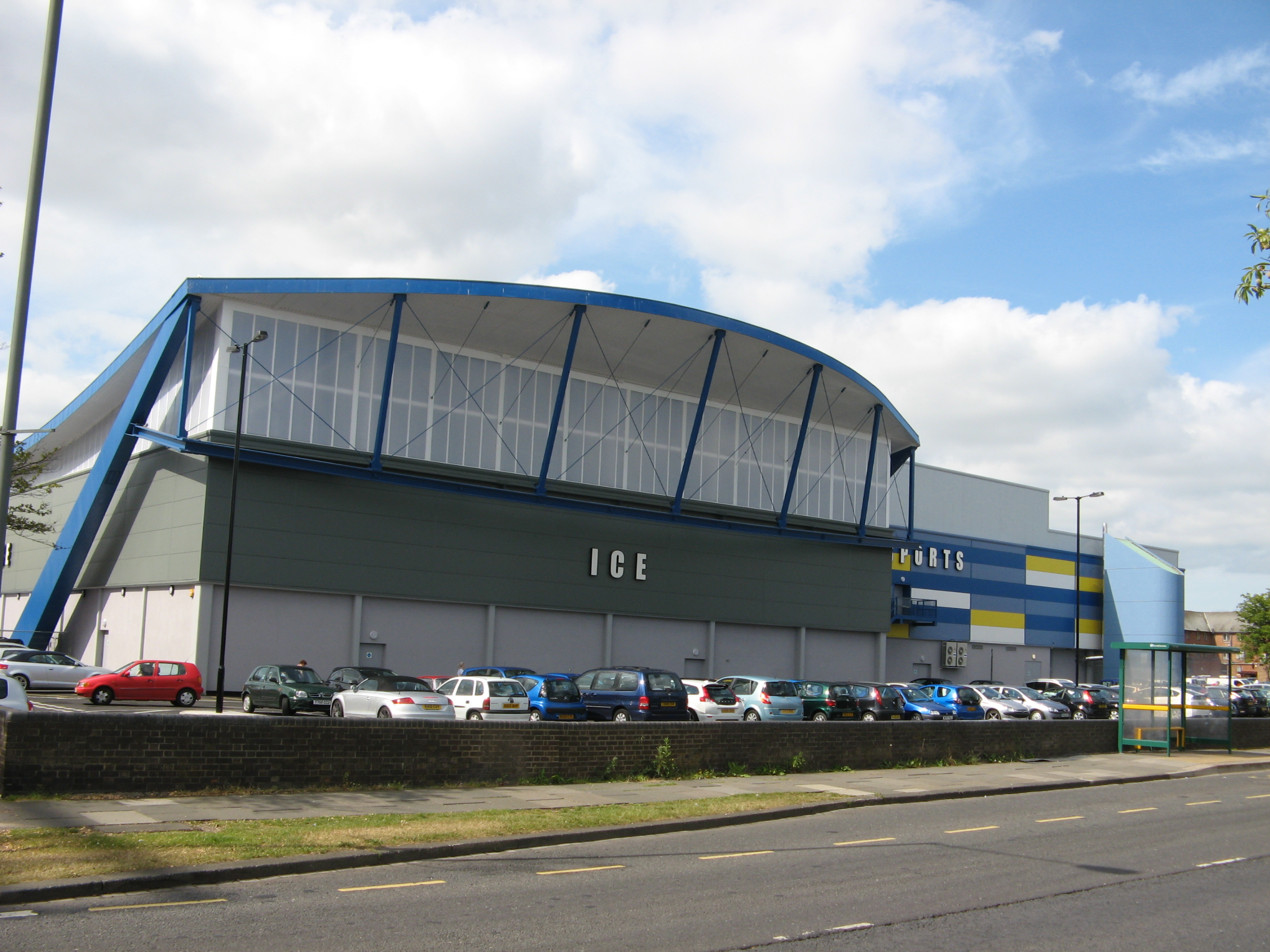
Billingham Forum

In 1967, Billingham Forum was opened by Queen Elizabeth II. A sports and leisure complex, it contains a swimming pool, an ice rink, and a number of sports halls. The complex also houses the Forum Theatre. Notable personalities that have performed in the theatre include Wendy Richard, Jimmy Edwards, Eric Sykes, Darren Day, Arthur Lowe, David Jason, Penelope Keith, Terry Scott and Timothy West.

As part of the proposals to regenerate Billingham, a 'Gateway' initiative proposed the construction of a new sports and leisure centre on John Whitehead Park to replace the Forum. This proved controversial, particularly as the Forum's would-be-replacement did not contain a theatre. The proposals were abandoned in November 2004, shortly after the Forum Theatre was granted Grade II listed building status.

Following a survey that reported 98% of participants in favour, Stockton Borough Council submitted a bid of £15–20 million to refurbish the Forum Complex in partnership with The Billingham Partnership group.

On 2 June 2011, the Billingham Forum returned from its £15m refurbishment, which started in mid-2009. Billingham Forum is owned by Stockton Borough Council and is managed by Tees Active Ltd.

== Notable people ==
=== People ===
- Jamie Bell, actor Billy Elliot, and The Eagle
- Dunstan Bruce, frontman of Chumbawamba and Interrobang!?, and director of documentary I Get Knocked Down
- Ann Ming, who succeeded in a campaing to change UK law for double jeopardy cases, following the murder of her daughter.
- Eddie Jobson, musician
- Paul Smith, frontman of Indie group Maxïmo Park
- Diane Youdale, AKA 'Jet' from Gladiators
- The Wilson Family, singing group, Durham Folk Festival Patrons, EFDSS Gold Badge Awardees

=== Sportspeople ===
- Andrew Davies, footballer for Middlesbrough F.C., Southampton F.C., Stoke City F.C., Bradford City A.F.C.
- Robert Dowd, professional ice hockey player for Sheffield Steelers
- Sean Gregan, footballer
- Tony Hall, footballer for Waterford United
- Evan Horwood, footballer
- Willie Maddren, former Middlesbrough F.C. footballer and manager
- Craig Willis, Rugby union player for Ealing Trailfinders
- Tommy Mooney, footballer
- Gary Pallister, footballer for Middlesbrough F.C., Manchester United and England.
- Jamie Pollock, former footballer for Manchester City
- Brad Walker, footballer
- Zooey Perry, handball player

== Climate ==
Billingham has an oceanic climate (Cfb). The town is fairly warm in the summer and the temperature can rise above 30 °C (86 °F) but this is rare. In the winter temperatures can drop below 0 °C (32 °F) but this is also rare.

The highest recorded July temperature occurred on Tuesday 19 July 2022, reaching 37 °C.

Climate data for Billingham, England (2003–2011)
Month	Jan	Feb	Mar	Apr	May	Jun	Jul	Aug	Sep	Oct	Nov	Dec	Year
Record high °C (°F)	14.3 (57.7)	17.0 (62.6)	24.5 (76.1)	25.9 (78.6)	30.6 (87.1)	30.6 (87.1)	37.0 (98.6)	31.4 (88.5)	28.8 (83.8)	28.4 (83.1)	17.9 (64.2)	16.3 (61.3)	32.2 (90.0)
Mean daily maximum °C (°F)	7.6 (45.7)	8.2 (46.8)	11.4 (52.5)	14.5 (58.1)	17.1 (62.8)	20.6 (69.1)	22.1 (71.8)	21.2 (70.2)	19.4 (66.9)	14.8 (58.6)	10.6 (51.1)	7.0 (44.6)	14.4 (57.9)
Mean daily minimum °C (°F)	2.1 (35.8)	1.7 (35.1)	2.8 (37.0)	4.8 (40.6)	7.3 (45.1)	10.5 (50.9)	12.3 (54.1)	12.1 (53.8)	10.2 (50.4)	7.4 (45.3)	4.3 (39.7)	1.1 (34.0)	6.3 (43.3)
Record low °C (°F)	−6.7 (19.9)	−6.4 (20.5)	−6.6 (20.1)	−2.9 (26.8)	−1.2 (29.8)	3.5 (38.3)	6.4 (43.5)	6.5 (43.7)	2.7 (36.9)	−2.6 (27.3)	−7.9 (17.8)	−11.6 (11.1)	−11.6 (11.1)
Source: Weather statistics collected from Billingham Weather Station
