= Yara Suomi =

Finnish fertilizer company

Yara Suomi Oy
- Formerly: Kemira GrowHow Oyj
- Company type: Wholly owned subsidiary
- Industry: Agriculture, chemicals
- Founded: 1920; 106 years ago
- Headquarters: Espoo, Finland
- Key people: Heikki Sirviö, CEO
- Products: Fertilizers, chemicals
- Revenue: ▲1,166.2 million EUR (2006)
- Net income: ▼7.8 million EUR (2006)
- Owner: Yara International
- Number of employees: 2,500 (2006)
- Website: www.yara.fi

Yara Suomi Oy (formerly Kemira GrowHow Oyj) is a fertilizer producer headquartered in Espoo, Finland. Its products are sold in over 100 countries but it has market stronghold in Northern Europe. Most of the revenue (55%) comes from Western Europe, particularly from the UK and Ireland (18%).

Kemira Growhow was a division of Kemira, which was originally a fertilizer producer owned by state of Finland. Kemira's operations were started in 1920, and Kemira Growhow was separated from the rest of Kemira in 2004. In 2004, Kemira Growhow had 2,700 employees, a revenue of 1,220.9 million euros, with profit 47.8 million euros.

On 24 May 2007, Yara International, a Norwegian rival, bought 30.05% of the company from the Finnish State and offered to buy the rest, valuing the company at 671.8 million euros. After the EU approval, Yara completed the acquisition, and in March 2008, Kemira GrowHow became Yara's subsidiary Yara Suomi and started rebranding its products to Yara.
