= Newspaper Row =

Newspaper Row may refer to:

- Newspaper Row (Boston)
- Newspaper Row (Minneapolis)
- Newspaper Row (New York City)
- Newspaper Row (San Francisco)
- Newspaper Row (Washington, D.C.)

== See also ==
- Business cluster
- Radio Row
- Restaurant Row
- Theater District
- Tin Pan Alley
