= Yunfeng Han =

Chinese businessperson (born 1959)

Yunfeng Han (Chinese: 韓雲峰) (born 9 October 1959) is a Chinese businessperson. He is the president of the Hanchen Group and an entrepreneur in the tobacco industry. Han is also the founder of Hanchen Agriculture business cluster in Hong Kong and Cambodia.

Han has worked on a large-scale agricultural development program in Southeast Asia.
