= Cluster Initiative Greenbook =

2003 research study on cluster development

The Cluster Initiative (CI) Greenbook is a research study on cluster development, written by Örjan Sölvell, Göran Lindqvist, and Christian Ketels, and first presented at the 2003 TCI conference in Gothenburg. The Greenbook was a joint initiative between Emiliano Duch, founder of the Cluster Competitiveness Group, and Lars Eklund, former President of the Competitiveness Institute, alongside the three authors. The report also contained a foreword by Michael Porter, who first proposed the business cluster in his 1990 book, The Competitive Advantage of Nations.

The Greenbook was centred on the Global Cluster Initiative Survey (GCIS) 2003, which collected data from 238 cluster initiatives around the world. Analysis of the GCIS data led the authors to develop the Cluster Initiative Performance Model (CIPM), a framework for evaluating cluster initiatives. The CIPM is a four-dimensional model, consisting of three drivers – setting, objectives and process – which affect the performance of a CI. The Greenbook applied the CIPM to a selection of CI case studies, including the digital media and creative industries cluster in Scotland and the consumer electronics cluster in Catalonia, Spain. The report also highlighted the role of cluster development in Slovenia's transition economy, with pilot initiatives in the automotive, toolmaking, and transport & logistics industries.

== Cluster Initiative Greenbook 2.0 ==
The Cluster Initiative Greenbook 2.0 was launched in 2013 and presented at the 16th TCI Global Conference in Kolding, Denmark. This report built on the authors' earlier works, including the 2005 USAID-commissioned survey of 1,400 CIs. The Greenbook 2.0 analysed data from 356 CIs that took part in the 2012 CGIS, expanding beyond mostly OECD economies. Alongside responding to the rapid global diffusion of CIs worldwide, the update reapplied the CIPM and offered new perspectives on cluster policy, introducing innovation as a key goal of such initiatives.

== See also ==
- Regional development
- Industrial district
- Innovation system
- Competitiveness
