= Business cluster =

Geographic concentration of related businesses

A business cluster is a geographic concentration of interconnected businesses, suppliers, and associated institutions in a particular field. Clusters are considered to increase the productivity with which companies can compete, nationally and globally. Accounting is a part of the business cluster.

In urban studies, the term agglomeration is used. Clusters are also important aspects of strategic management.

== Concept ==
The term business cluster, also known as an industry cluster, competitive cluster, or Porterian cluster, was introduced and popularized by Michael Porter in The Competitive Advantage of Nations (1990). The importance of economic geography, or more correctly geographical economics, was also brought to attention by Paul Krugman in Geography and Trade (1991). Cluster development relies on the underlying concepts established by Alfred Marshall in 1890. The development of business clusters is supported by three principle factors, which Marshall summarized under the headings labour-market effects, input-output dependency, knowledge spillovers.

Michael Porter claims that clusters have the potential to affect competition in three ways: by increasing the productivity of the companies in the cluster, by driving innovation in the field, and by stimulating new businesses in the field. According to Porter, in the modern global economy, comparative advantage, whereby certain locations have special endowments (i.e., harbor, cheap labor) helping them overcome heavy input costs, has become less relevant. Now, competitive advantage, in which companies make productive use of inputs, requiring continual innovation, is more important. Porter argues that economic activities are embedded in social activities; that 'social glue binds clusters together'. This is supported by recent research showing that particularly in regional and rural areas, significantly more innovation takes place in communities which have stronger inter-personal networks.

The Hollywood film industry has been studied in literature since the mid-1980s as example of cluster with post-Fordist flexible specialization. However, Silicon Valley has been most influential in cluster theory as well as cluster policies and programs. An industry cluster is a production system limited to a geographic region were related industries and colocations interlink customers and suppliers. The cluster region needs to retain a decisive sustainable competitive advantage over other places, or even a world supremacy in that field.

A cluster is most of the time the result of initiatives, since it implies to convince current competitors to work jointly. The initiative usually comes from the political sphere e.g. the different Singaporian clusters, but it can also come from the industry itself. The initiative of Bart J. Groot, the director of Dow Olefinverbund GmbH, a major chemicals complex at the intersection of three Eastern German states Saxony, Saxony-Anhalt, and Thuringia after the German reunification conts as one example. The goal was to "encourage coordination among political and administrative officials" of Mitteldeutschland.

== Types ==
=== By composition ===
Following development of the concept of inter organizational networks in Germany and practical development of clusters in the United Kingdom; many perceive there to be four methods by which a cluster can be identified:

- Geographical cluster – as stated above e.g. the California wine cluster or the flower cluster between Rotterdam and Amsterdam in the Netherlands.
- Sectoral clusters (a cluster of businesses operating together from within the same commercial sector e.g. marine (south east England; Cowes and now Solent) and photonics (Aston Science Park, Birmingham))
- Horizontal cluster (interconnections between businesses at a sharing of resources level e.g. knowledge management, machinery, lab and test tools, material supply, professional employment)
- Vertical cluster (i.e. a supply chain cluster).

It is also expected – particularly in the German model of organizational networks – that interconnected businesses must interact and have firm actions within at least two separate levels of the organizations concerned.

=== By type of comparative advantage ===
Several types of business clusters, based on different kinds of knowledge, are recognized:

- High-tech clusters – These clusters are high technology-oriented, well adapted to the knowledge economy, and typically have as a core renowned universities and research centers like Silicon Valley, the East London Tech City or Paris-Saclay. An exceptional example of a prominent high-tech cluster that does not include a university is the High Tech Campus Eindhoven, located in the Dutch city of Eindhoven.
- Historic know-how-based clusters – These are based on more traditional economic activities that maintain their advantage in know-how over the years, and for some of them, over many centuries. They are often industry-specific. An example is London as financial center.
- Factor endowment clusters – They are created because a comparative advantage they might have linked to a geographical position. For example, wine production clusters because of sunny regions surrounded by mountains, where good grapes can grow. This is like certain areas in France such as Burgundy and Champagne, as well as Lombardy, Spain, Chile and California.
- Low-cost manufacturing clusters – These clusters have typically emerged in developing countries within particular industries, such as automotive production, electronics, or textiles. Examples include electronics clusters in Mexico (e.g. Guadalajara) and Argentina (e.g. Córdoba). Cluster firms typically serve clients in developed countries. Drivers of cluster emergence include availability of low-cost labor, geographical proximity to clients (e.g. in the case of Mexico for U.S. clients; Eastern Europe for Western European clients).
- Knowledge services clusters – Like low-cost manufacturing clusters, these clusters have emerged typically in developing countries. They have been characterized by the availability of lower-cost skills and expertise serving a growing global demand for increasingly commoditized (i.e. standardized, less firm-specific) knowledge services, e.g. software development, engineering support, analytical services. Examples include Bangalore, India; Recife, Brazil; Shanghai, China. Multinational corporations have played an important role in "customizing" business conditions in these clusters. One example for this is the establishment of collaborative linkages with local universities to secure the supply of qualified, yet lower-cost engineers.

== Process ==
The process of identifying, defining, and describing a cluster is not standardized. Individual economic consultants and researchers develop their own methodologies. All cluster analysis relies on evaluation of local and regional employment patterns, based on industrial categorizations such as NAICS or the increasingly obsolete SIC codes. Notable databases providing statistical data on clusters and industry agglomeration include:

- The Cluster Mapping Project (for the USA), conducted by the Institute for Strategy and Competitiveness at Harvard Business School
- The European Cluster Observatory (for Europe), managed by the Center for Strategy and Competitiveness at the Stockholm School of Economics

An alternative to clusters, reflecting the distributed nature of business operations in the wake of globalization, is hubs and nodes.

== The Silicon Valley case ==
In the mid- to late 1990s several successful computer technology related companies emerged in Silicon Valley in California. This led anyone who wished to create a startup company to do so in Silicon Valley. The surge in the number of Silicon Valley startups led to a number of venture capital firms relocating to or expanding their Valley offices. This in turn encouraged more entrepreneurs to locate their startups there.

In other words, venture capitalists (sellers of finance) and dot-com startups (buyers of finance) "clustered" in and around a geographical area.

The cluster effect in the capital market also led to a cluster effect in the labor market. As an increasing number of companies started up in Silicon Valley, programmers, engineers etc. realized that they would find greater job opportunities by moving to Silicon Valley. This concentration of technically skilled people in the valley meant that startups around the country knew that their chances of finding job candidates with the proper skill-sets were higher in the valley, hence giving them added incentive to move there. This in turn led to more high-tech workers moving there. Similar effects have also been found in the Cambridge IT Cluster (UK).

== The Digital Media City case ==
In the late 1990s, the Seoul Metropolitan Government in South Korea developed the Digital Media City (DMC), a 135-acre complex, four miles outside of the city's central business district in the Sangam-dong district. With Seoul's rapidly growing cluster of multi-media, IT, and entertainment industries, the Digital Media City, through its vibrant agglomeration, helped to promote these industries and companies whose core business required use of information, communication, and media technologies. DMC grew and prospered as a global business environment, raising Seoul as an east-Asian hub of commerce. The cluster of its digital media-related, high-tech firms spawned partnerships which in turn leveraged both human and social capital in the area. Eventually, DMC fed the innovation of more than 10,000 small-scale Internet, game, and telecommunication firms located in Seoul.

In development of DMC, the Seoul government leveraged initial funding by private technology partners and developers. It is also provided IT broadband and wireless networks to the area as well as needed infrastructure. The Seoul government even provided tax incentives and favorable land prices for magnet tenants who would attract other firms to the area due to established business relationships and through their presence which would in turn promote DMC as a prime location.

With such a concentration of these entities, Seoul has become a major nexus of high-technology and digital media. It is home to digital media R&D firms across a range of types including cultural media creation, digital media technologies, digital broadcasting centers, technology offices, and entertainment firms. Just outside the DMC complex include international firm affiliates, schools, moderate to low income housing, commercial and convention facilities, entertainment zones, and the city's central rail station. The cohesive connection of industry, cultural centers, infrastructure, and human capital has fostered Seoul as a strong metropolitan economy and South Korea, the Miracle on the Han River, as a storied nation transitioning from a manufacturing to an innovation economy.

== Cluster effect ==
The cluster effect can be more easily perceived in any urban agglomeration, as most kinds of commercial establishments will tend to spontaneously group themselves by category. Shoe shops (or cloth shops), for instance, are rarely isolated from their competition. In fact, it is common to find whole streets of them. The cluster effect is similar to but not the same as the network effect.

Governments and companies often try to use the cluster effect to promote a particular place as good for a certain type of business. For example, the city of Bangalore, India has utilized the cluster effect in order to convince a number of high-tech companies to set up shop there. Similarly, Las Vegas has benefited through the cluster effect of the gambling industry. In France, the national industrial policy includes support for a specific form of business clusters, called Pôles de Compétitivité, such as Cap Digital. Another good example is the Nano/Microelectronics and Embedded Systems" or in short "mi-Cluster" that was facilitated by "Corallia Cluster Initiative" in Greece. Corallia introduced a bottom-up, 3-phase programme framework for facilitating cluster development, and was short-listed among the final classification (finalists) for the DG REGIO's RegioStars 2009 Awards in the category "Research, Technological Development and Innovation".

Clusters, were proved to boost the innovative activity among firms of the same industry. One of the main causes that might be highlighted is the competition between the companies. Moreover, except of stimulating a favorable conditions for the exchange of ideas, industry-specific regional concentrations, also create a thick labor market input. Hence innovations increase the accumulation of the knowledge in the region which influences on the local internal economies.

The cluster effect does not continue forever though. To sustain cluster performance in the long term, clusters need to manage network openness to business outside the cluster while facilitating strong inter-organisational relationships within the cluster.

Sometimes cluster strategies still do not produce enough of a positive impact to be justified in certain industries. For instance, in the case of Builders Square, the home improvement retailer could not compete with industry leaders such as Home Depot when it could not realize the same low costs and contracts. As a result, it was presented with an option to form a merger with another home improvement retailer, Hechinger to better improve their business clusters and compete with Home Depot and other industry leaders. However, when it failed to do so, it slowly began to fail and eventually fell into bankruptcy. Although the merger attempted to create geographic clusters to compete with the low costs of other firms, costs were not lowered enough and eventually the plan failed, forcing Hechinger into Chapter 7 liquidation and Builders Square out of the industry.

Clusters can also fail if the regional economy does not adapt with the times. In Detroit, when the automotive industry declined, the cluster and the city declined with it. Clusters can fail if they do not use their position to reinvent themselves and move into other industries before the tipping point is reached. In terms of the level of cluster members' innovation performance this type of a system can be usually characterized by a low level of uptake of different technologies due to the limited contacts that actors have with industrial companies focusing mainly on the same areas of interests.

== See also ==
- Cluster Initiative Greenbook
- Diamond District
- Economies of agglomeration
- Entrepreneurial ecosystem
- Economic restructuring
- Fashion Avenue
- Garment District
- Industrial district
- Innovation Cluster Rating, ranking of the top 100 science and technology clusters worldwide
- Living lab
- Meatpacking District
- Mega-Site
- Metropolitan economy
- Newspaper Row
- Radio Row
- Restaurant Row
- Research-intensive cluster
- Theater District
- Tin Pan Alley
