= Karl Koch Steel Consulting =

Steel construction firm in Oyster Bay, New York

Karl Koch Steel Consulting is a steel construction firm, based in Oyster Bay, New York. The company was established in the 1950s as Karl Koch Erecting Company, Inc., of Carteret, New Jersey. The Karl Koch Erecting Company was hired by the Port Authority of New York and New Jersey as one of the companies to supply steel for construction of the World Trade Center. The company was also hired to do all the work of erecting the steel at the construction site.
