= Cluster development =

Economic development of business clusters

Cluster development (or cluster initiative or economic clustering) is the economic development of business clusters. The cluster concept has rapidly attracted attention from governments, consultants, and academics since it was first proposed in 1990 by Michael Porter.

== Clusters ==
One of the most well-known clusters is the California Wine Cluster. It is a mass of interrelated businesses including, but not limited to commercial wineries, independent wine grape growers, suppliers of grape stock, irrigation, and harvesting equipment, barrels and labels, public relations and advertising agencies, and publication firms involved with consumer and trade audiences.

Another example is the Italian Leather Fashion Cluster. Like the California Wine Cluster, this also includes an array of interrelated businesses including world-famous brands Ferragamo and Gucci. Several chain industries make up this cluster including leather goods producers (clothing, belts, footwear, handbags), specialized services for machineries, design service, tanneries, plastic working equipment, and specialized machine tools.

Clusters, developed around a core city, factor in significant spillover and multiplier effects of urban development such as spatial distribution, connectivity, productivity, industrial linkages, and competitiveness.

Many governments and industry organizations around the globe have turned to this concept in recent years as a means to stimulate urban and rural economic growth. As a result, a large number of cluster initiative organizations were started during the 1990s, and the trend continues. The first comprehensive study of cluster initiatives around the world was reported in the "Cluster Initiative Greenbook" published by Örjan Sölvell, Christian Ketels and Göran Lindqvist, with a foreword by Michael Porter. The report was presented at the annual meeting of The Competitiveness Institute, TCI, in Gothenburg in 2003. A follow-up study in 2005 covered more than 1400 cluster initiative organizations around the globe. In 2013, a decade after the first Greenbook, The Greenbook 2.0 was launched at the TCI global conference in Kolding, Denmark.

While the purpose of cluster initiative organizations is to promote economic development within the cluster by improving the competitiveness of one or several specific business sectors, it is important to differentiate these public-private organizations from policy-making organizations at different levels, e.g., national government units such as the UK Department of Trade and Industry (DTI), and supranational bodies such as the OECD and the European Commission and from industry associations comprising firms within one business sector, e.g., biotech, steel.

More specifically, cluster initiatives are organizations or projects that are organized as collaborations between a diverse number of public and private sector actors, such as firms, government agencies, and academic institutions. Whereas lobbying policymakers may be one of the cluster initiative's activities, cluster initiatives generally are involved in a broad range of activities, e.g., supply-chain development, market intelligence, incubator services, attraction of foreign direct investment, management training, joint R&D projects, marketing of the region, and setting technical standards.

In June 2007, the European Cluster Observatory was launched. Financed by the European Commission DG Enterprise and Industry, it provides information about clusters, cluster initiatives, and cluster policy throughout 32 European countries. An example of a business cluster from the United Kingdom is the Northeast of England Process Industry Cluster (NEPIC). Information on this cluster and other European Clusters can be found on the European Cluster Observatory.

In 2009, under the Competitiveness and Innovation programme, the European Commission launched the European Cluster Excellence Programme from which the European Secretariat for Cluster Analysis (ESCA) was established. ESCA has since worked to spread best practice and improve the professionalism of Cluster managers across Europe by benchmarking, advising on best practice, analysing and accrediting Cluster organisations across the EU. ESCA's work has now extended beyond the borders of the EU including North America and Asia. By October 2014 ESCA had analysed 610 cluster organisations in 35 countries leading to Bronze level labelling. By October 45 Clusters have been awarded the Gold Label. An example of an ESCA Gold label Cluster is the North East of England Process Industry Cluster (NEPIC).

The concept of cluster has reached and gained the attention of other parts of the globe following its success in Europe. For South Asia to become a leading economic power, development of its cities as prospective centers of growth and dynamism holds great promise. By being centers of economic activity, urban clusters both define and influence the economic geography of countries and regions.

== See also ==
- Innovation system
- Northeast of England Process Industry Cluster
- Village Earth Cluster Development Approach
