= Radio Row =

Urban area with a large number of businesses selling radio equipment

Coordinates: 40°42′39.4″N 74°0′45.5″W

Radio Row is a nickname for an urban street or district specializing in the sale of radio and electronic equipment and parts. Radio Rows arose in many cities with the 1920s rise of broadcasting and declined after the middle of the 20th century.

== New York City ==
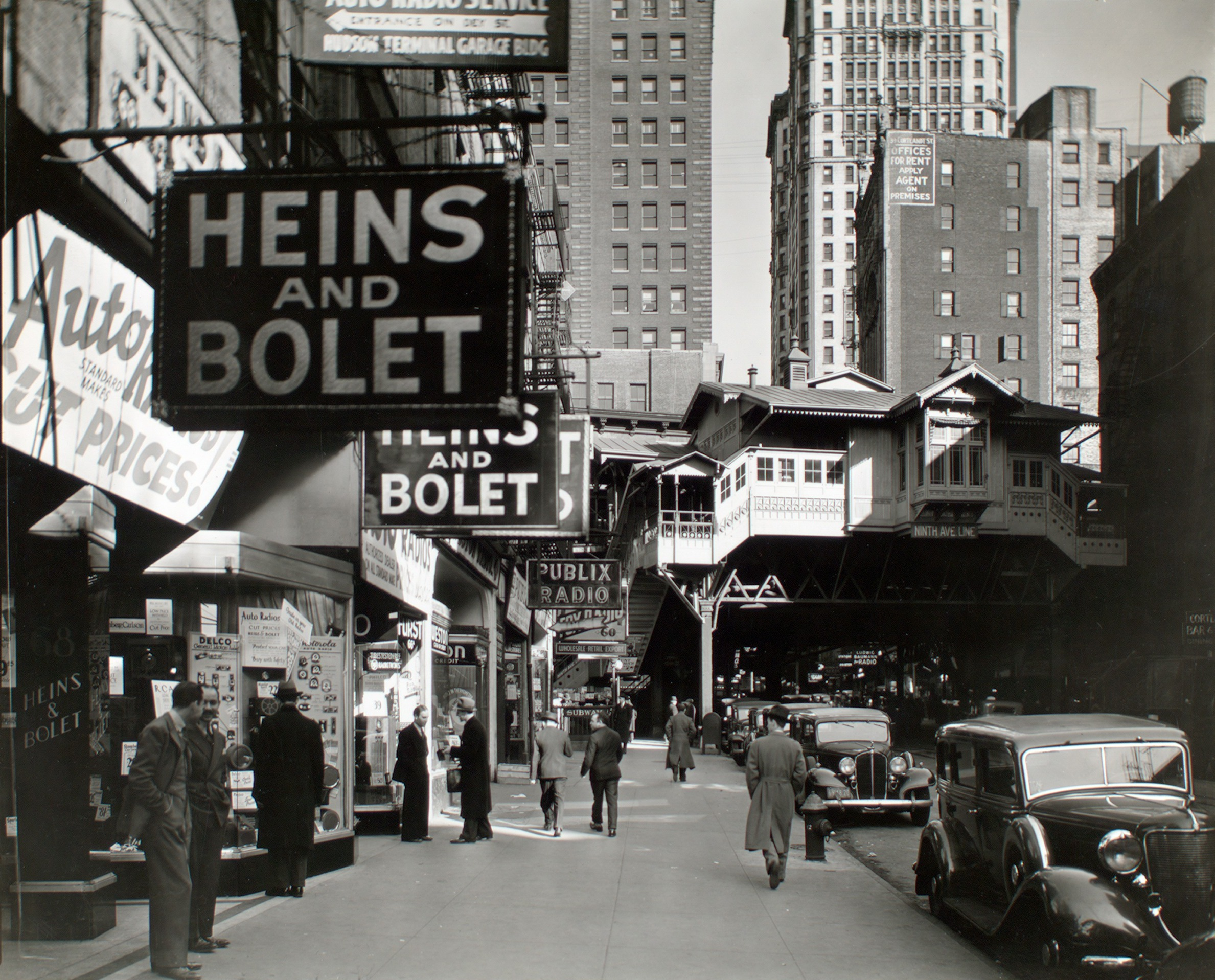
Heins and Bolet, the oldest radio store, open since 1920, on New York City's Radio Row with the Cortlandt subway station in the background, and an elevated train station above, in a 1936 photograph by Berenice Abbott

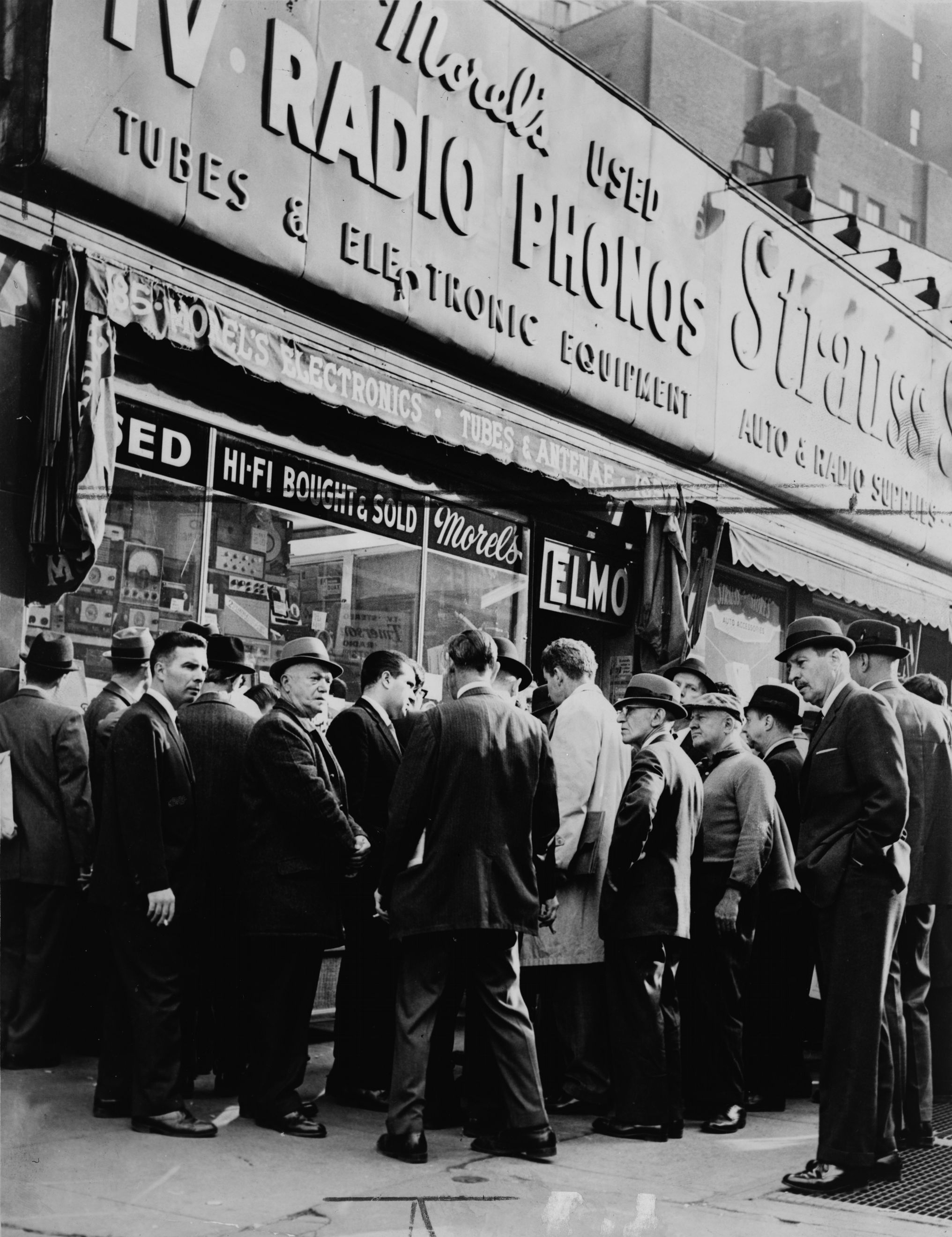
A crowd gathers near an electronics shop at Greenwich and Dey streets after John F. Kennedy's assassination on November 22, 1963

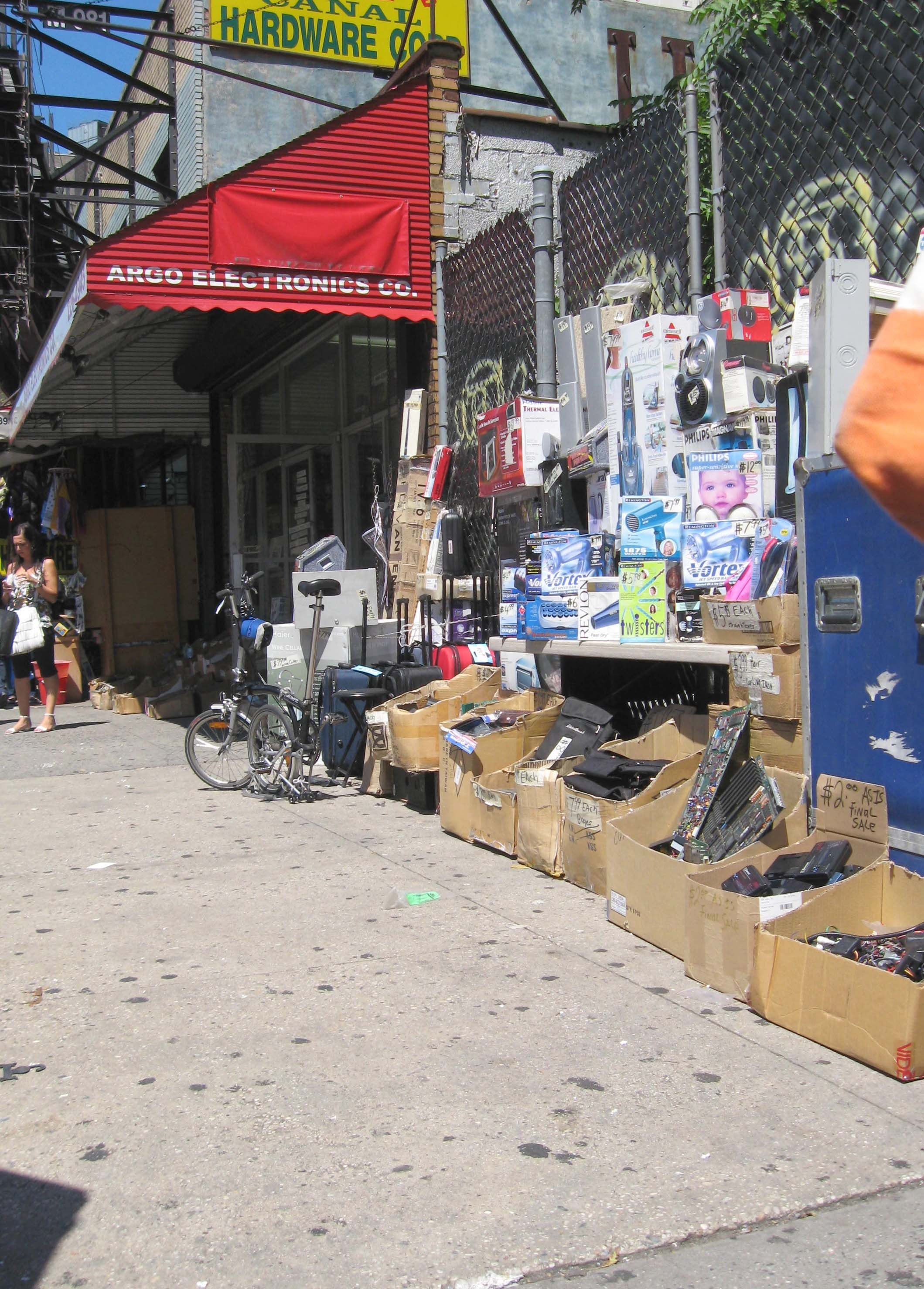
Sidewalk bins of a defunct shop at 393 Canal Street

=== Construction and existence ===
New York City's Radio Row, which existed from 1921 to 1966, was a warehouse district on the Lower West Side of Manhattan, New York City. Major firms that started there include Arrow Electronics, Avnet (founded by Charles Avnet in 1921), New Yorker Electronics, and Schweber Electronics.

The first of many radio-related stores was City Radio, opened in 1921 by Harry Schneck on Cortlandt Street, which became the central axis of a several-block area of electronics stores.

The New York Times made an early reference to "Radio Row" in 1927, when Cortlandt Street celebrated a "Radio Jubilee". The Times reported that "Today ... Cortlandt Street is 'Radio Row,' while Broadway is just a thoroughfare." The street was closed for vehicular traffic and decorated with flags and bunting, and the Times reported plans for New York's acting mayor Joseph V. McKee to present a "key to Cortlandt Street" to the then-reigning Miss New York, Frieda Louise Mierse, while a contest was held to name a "Miss Downtown Radio."

Pete Hamill recalled that, as a child, "On Saturday mornings, I used to venture from Brooklyn with my father to Radio Row on Cortlandt Street in Lower Manhattan, where he and hundreds of other New York men moved from stall to stall in search of the elusive tube that would make the radio work again. Later, my brothers went there with him in search of television components. Radio Row was a piece of all our interior maps."

In 1930, The New York Times described Radio Row as located on Greenwich Street "where Cortlandt Street intersects it and the Ninth Avenue Elevated forms a canopy over the roadway...The largest concentration is in the block bounded by Dey Street on the north and Cortlandt on the south, but Radio Row does not stop there; it overflows around the corner, around several corners, embracing in all some five crowded blocks." It estimated 40 or 50 stores in the vicinity, "all going full blast at the same time. There may be regulations prohibiting this vociferous practice, but if the radio dealers have anything to say it about it, it will never have the slightest effect along Radio Row....The clamor is heard even as one walks through the subway tunnel to the street exit....The first impression, and in fact the only one, is auditory, a reverberating bedlam, a confusion of sounds which only an army of loudspeakers could produce." It noted, in addition to merchants selling radio sets, "others display mostly accessories...one shopkeeper last week featured a crystal set small enough to fit into a pocket, and another gave prominent position to a bucket of condensers about an inch in side."

In 1944, during World War II, The New York Times lamented that the "one-time repository of nearly everything from a tube socket to a complete radio station" was "bargainless and practically setless, too, due to wartime scarcities" but that it still catered to "tinkerers and engineers" and that an "old spirit" and "magical quality" were still there. One shop said it was practically able to stay in business just by "making repairs on the electric meters burned out by the students of the city schools who were studying radio," and all were optimistic about growing public interest in "two new kinds of radio: FM and television."

But Radio Row rebounded. The used radios, war surplus electronics (e.g., ARC-5 radios), junk, and parts often piled so high they would spill out onto the street, attracting collectors and scroungers. According to a business writer, it also was the origin of the electronic component distribution business.

=== Demolition ===
Radio Row was torn down in 1966 to make room for the World Trade Center. Five years earlier, the Port Authority of New York and New Jersey rejected a proposal to build the new complex on the east side of Lower Manhattan's Financial District. Instead, officials chose a site on the west side, near Hudson Terminal, and began planning to use eminent domain to remove the shops in the area bounded by Vesey, Church, Liberty, and West streets.

Local opposition arose to the decision to raze the streets on the west side for the World Trade Center. Sam Slate reported on this for WCBS Radio in 1962:

Shaping up in New York City is a legal battle of overriding importance. Its outcome will conceivably affect us all. If the considerable power of the Port Authority is allowed to dispossess the merchants of Radio Row, then, it is our conviction, no home or business is safe from the caprice of government.

The city also objected to the compensation given for the streets themselves obscured by the superblock.

A committee of small business owners led by Oscar Nadel took exception to the Port Authority's offer of $30,000 to any business in the condemned area, regardless of its size or age. Nadel's group, who estimated that businesses in the area employed 30,000 people and generated $300 million per year, sued the Port Authority. But the court ultimately threw out the case, called Courtesy Sandwich Shop v. Port of New York Authority, in November 1963 "for want of a substantial federal question".

After the closing of these stores, the concentration of radio retailers was not duplicated elsewhere in New York. Some clusters of radio and electronics stores were created or added to in the Canal Street and Union Square areas. A large black-and-white photo mural of Radio Row can be viewed at the PATH's World Trade Center station.

== Cleveland ==
According to The Plain Dealer in 1928, a section of Downtown Cleveland along Prospect Ave. from East 4th to East 9th Street was known as "Radio Row" for its radio and electronic-goods shops.

== Philadelphia ==
In the 1950s and 1960s, Philadelphia's Arch Street from 6th to 11th Streets was known as Radio Row, after its electronic-goods stores.

== Asia ==
- Akihabara, Tokyo, Japan
- Apliu Street, New Kowloon, Hong Kong
- Huaqiangbei, Futian District, Shenzhen, Guangdong, China, has the largest electronics market in the world
- Yongsan Electronics Market, Seoul, Korea
- Guang Hua Digital Plaza, Taipei, Taiwan
- Pudu Market, Kuala Lumpur, Malaysia
- York Street, Sydney, Australia

== Europe ==
- In London, Tottenham Court Road, Edgware Road, and Lisle Street had surplus electronics shops.

== Other meanings ==
=== Boston residences ===
In 1923, The Boston Globe reported that a section of Boston's North End had been dubbed "Radio Row" because of its many radio antennas. "The hurdy-gurdy has a rival," wrote the Globe. "No skyline anywhere else in the city or the suburbs is filled with so many antennae as the blocks stretching along some sections of Hanover and Salem sts. Many residents have three or four aerials—one has six—with wires leading down to receiving sets of all descriptions, in the homes of the foreign-born residents. It has all come about in a few months....All stairways lead to the roof, where [some residents] are arranging to rig up a loudspeaker, connected with instruments below. A survey of housetops...shows a whole population getting ready."

=== Los Angeles broadcasting ===
In Los Angeles during the 1940s and 1950s, "Radio Row" referred to the area near the intersection of Sunset Boulevard and Vine Street in Hollywood, where all four major radio networks had broadcasting facilities.

=== Media event broadcasting ===
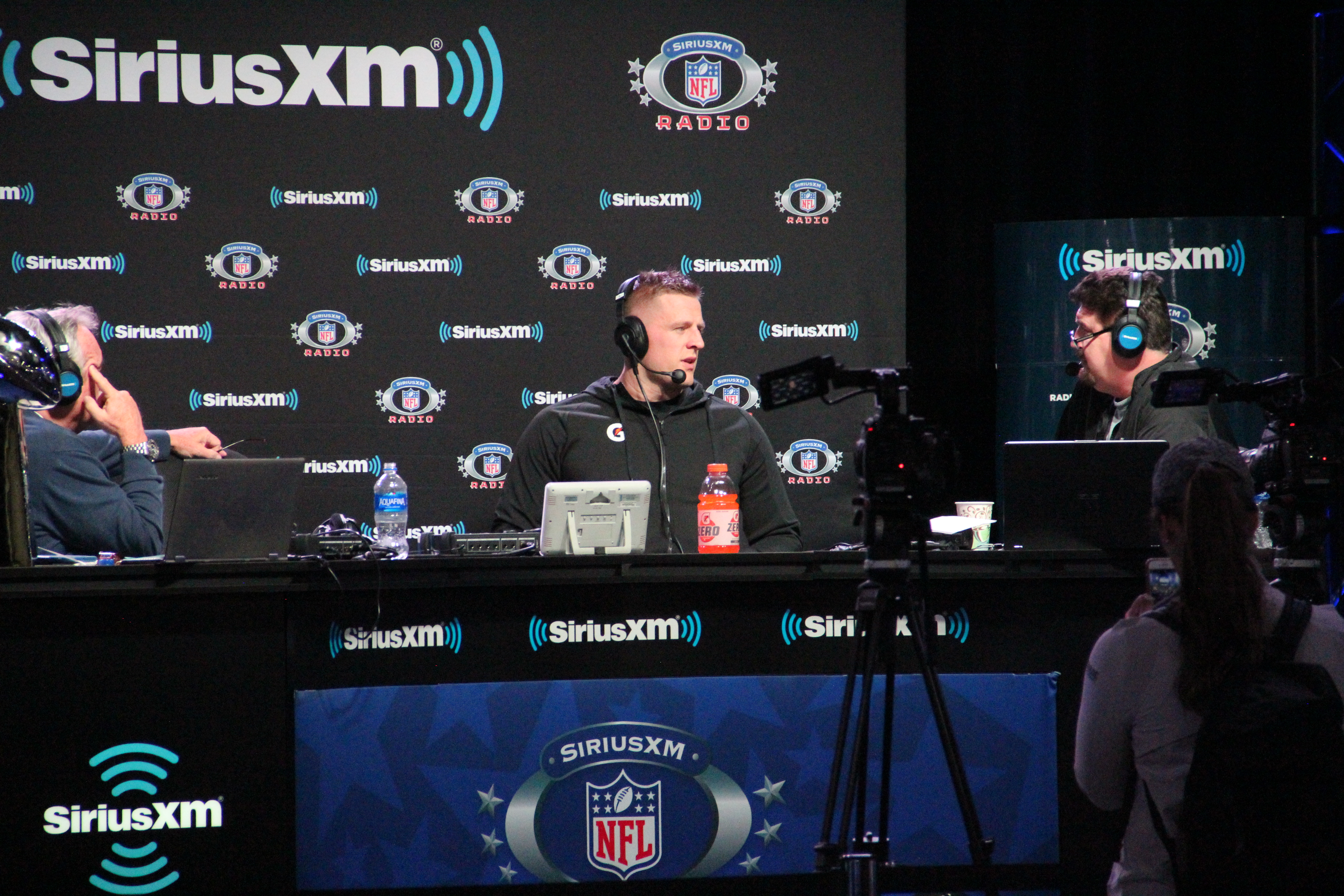
A broadcast from Super Bowl LIII Radio Row in February 2019

Radio Row may also refer to a large grouping of sports talk radio stations that broadcast from the Super Bowl media center during the week before the annual major football game.

== See also ==
- Surplus store
- Business cluster
- Electronic waste
- Tin Pan Alley
- Newspaper Row
