= Newspaper Row (Minneapolis) =

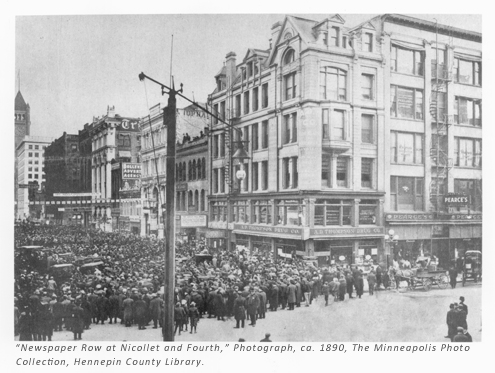
Newspaper Row in Minneapolis

Newspaper Row was a newspaper district along fourth street in Minneapolis. It served as the headquarters of the Saturday Evening Spectator, the Minneapolis Journal, Minneapolis Tribune, Minneapolis Penny Press, and the Minneapolis Times, and held the Minneapolis offices of the St. Paul Globe and The Pioneer Press.
