= Theater District =

A theater district (also spelled theatre district) is a common name for a neighborhood containing a city's theaters.

== Places ==
- Theater District, Manhattan, New York City
- Boston Theater District
- Buffalo Theater District
- Cleveland Theater District
- Houston Theater District
- Broadway Theater District (Los Angeles)
- Theater District (San Francisco, California)
- Yiddish Theater District, New York City
- Theater District (Tacoma, Washington)

== Railway stations ==
- Theater District station, Houston, Texas
- South 9th Street/Theater District station, Tacoma, Washington
