= List of the largest Sites of Special Scientific Interest in England =

This is a list of the largest Sites of Special Scientific Interest in England in decreasing order of size. A lower threshold of 100 hectares or one square kilometre has been used.

== Sites more than 10,000 hectares in size ==
Site name	Area of Search	Reason for designation		Area^{[ a]}		Grid reference	Year in which notified	Map^{[B]}
Site name	Area of Search	Biological interest	Geological interest	Hectares	Acres	Grid reference	Year in which notified	Map^{[B]}
The Wash	Norfolk / Lincolnshire	✓		63,135.0	156,010.0	TF550400	1972	
North York Moors	North Yorkshire / Cleveland	✓		44,087.7	108,943.1	NZ680000	1998	
Humber Estuary	East Riding of Yorkshire / Lincolnshire	✓	✓	37,000.6	91,430.5	TA216184	2004	
Dark Peak	Derbyshire / Greater Manchester / South Yorkshire / West Yorkshire	✓	✓	31,852.9	78,710.2	SK110960	1951	
Morecambe Bay	Cumbria / Lancashire	✓		30,287.5	74,842.0	SD360700	1975	
Upper Solway Flats and Marshes	Cumbria / ?	✓	✓	29,950.5	74,009.3	NY160610	1988	
The New Forest	Hampshire / Wiltshire	✓	✓	28,947.4	71,530.6	SU298081	1959	Map
South Pennine Moors	West Yorkshire / Great Manchester / Lancashire / North Yorkshire	✓	✓	20,938.1	51,739.2	SD920300	1994	
Salisbury Plain	Wiltshire / Hampshire	✓		19,689.9	48,654.8	SU070500	1975	Map
Breckland Forest	Norfolk / Suffolk	✓	✓	18,078.7	44,673.4	TL819839	2000	
Severn Estuary	Avon / Somerset + others	✓	✓	15,950.0	39,413.3	ST480830	1976	
Upper Teesdale	County Durham	✓	✓	14,035.6	34,682.7	NY830320	1951	
Moorhouse and Cross Fell	Cumbria / County Durham	✓	✓	13,707.0	33,870.7	NY715365	1990	
Dee Estuary	Cheshire / Clwyd	✓		13,679.7	33,803.3	SJ220800	1954	
Breckland Farmland	Norfolk / Suffolk	✓		13,335.7	32,953.2	TL762783	2000	
North Dartmoor	Devon	✓	✓	13,413.2	33,144.7	SX580850	1952	
North Exmoor	Devon / Somerset	✓	✓	12,005.3	29,665.7	SS800430	1954	

Note that several of these Sites of Special Scientific Interest have adjacent protected areas that are contiguous and so the total contiguous area of land that is protected can be larger than these figures. e.g. Upper Teesdale SSSI and Moorhouse and Cross Fell SSSI form a continuous area of protection.

== Sites more than 4000 hectares in size ==
Site name	Area of Search	Reason for designation		Area^{[ a]}		Grid reference	Year in which notified	Map^{[B]}
Site name	Area of Search	Biological interest	Geological interest	Hectares	Acres	Grid reference	Year in which notified	Map^{[B]}
South Dartmoor	Devon	✓	✓	9,668.2	23,890.6	SX630690	1952	
Hexhamshire Moors	County Durham / Northumberland	✓		9,433.9	23,311.7	NY870530	1998	Map
Kielderhead and Emblehope Moors	Northumberland	✓		8,254.4	20,397.1	NT700000	1971	
Eastern Peak District Moors	South Yorkshire / ?	✓	✓	8,094.4	20,001.7	SK270770	1955	Map
Bollihope, Pikestone, Eggleston and Woodland Fells	County Durham	✓		7,949.2	19,642.9	NZ005300	1996	Map
North Norfolk Coast	Norfolk	✓	✓	7,700.0	19,027.1	TG020440	1954	
Duddon Estuary	Cumbria	✓	✓	6,806.3	16,818.7	SD151753	1990 (amalgamated 5)	Map
Mersey Estuary	Cheshire / Merseyside	✓		6,702.1	16,561.2	SJ440800	1951	
The Swale	Kent	✓	✓	6,568.4	16,230.9	TR000670	1968	
Blackwater Estuary	Essex	✓	✓	5,738.0	14,178.9	TL940070	1955	
South Thames Estuary and Marshes	Kent	✓		5,449.1	13,465.0	TQ770785	1951	
Bodmin Moor, North	Cornwall	✓		4,957.0	12,249.0	SX160810	1951	
Kielder Mires	Cumbria / Northumberland	✓		4,818.0	11,905.5	NY670800	1995	
Bowes Moor	County Durham	✓		4,457.7	11,015.2	NY923104	1989	Map
Poole Harbour	Dorset	✓		4,049.0	10,005.3	SZ000890	1964	

== Sites more than 2000 hectares in size ==
Site name	Area of Search	Reason for designation		Area^{[ a]}		Grid reference	Year in which notified	Map^{[B]}
Site name	Area of Search	Biological interest	Geological interest	Hectares	Acres	Grid reference	Year in which notified	Map^{[B]}
Chichester Harbour	Hampshire / West Sussex	✓	✓	3,695.0	9,130.5	SU760000	1970	
Bridgwater Bay	Somerset	✓		3,574.1	8,831.8	ST290480	1989	
Dungeness	East Sussex / Kent	✓	✓	3,241.7	8,010.4	TR050180	1951	
Ashdown Forest	East Sussex	✓		3,144.6	7,770.5	TQ450300	1953	
South Exmoor	Devon / Somerset	✓		3,132.7	7,741.1	SS880340	1992	
Long Mynd	Shropshire	✓	✓	2,637.6	6,517.7	SO420950	1953	
Alde-Ore Estuary	Suffolk	✓		2,554.3	6,311.8	TM394757	1952	
The Quantocks	Somerset	✓		2,506.9	6,194.7	ST140390	1970	Map
Ouse Washes	Cambridgeshire / Norfolk	✓		2,403.0	5,937.9	TL482867	1955	
Exe Estuary	Devon	✓	✓	2,186.6	5,403.2	SX980845	1952	
East Dartmoor	Devon	✓	✓	2,088.1	5,159.8	SX695815	1976	
Langstone Harbour	Hampshire	✓		2,069.4	5,113.6	SU700030	1958	

== Sites more than 1500 hectares in size ==
Site name	Area of Search	Reason for designation		Area^{[ a]}		Grid reference	Year in which notified	Map^{[B]}
Site name	Area of Search	Biological interest	Geological interest	Hectares	Acres	Grid reference	Year in which notified	Map^{[B]}
Thorne Crowle and Goole Moors	East Riding / South Yorkshire	✓		1,918.6	4,741.0	SE730160	1970	
Windsor Forest and Great Park	Berkshire / Surrey	✓		1,771.2	4,376.7	SU970685	1973	
Exmoor Coastal Heaths	Somerset	✓		1,758.3	4,344.9	SS620480	1994	Map
Wyre Forest	Shropshire / Hereford & Worcester	✓		1,753.7	4,333.5	SS750760	1955	
Epping Forest	Essex / Greater London	✓		1,728.0	4,270.0	TL475035	1953	
Porton Down	Wiltshire	✓		1,561.8	3,859.3	SU240365	1977	Map
Rutland Water	Leicestershire	✓		1,540.1	3,805.7	SK928070	1981	

== Sites more than 1000 hectares in size ==
Site name	Area of Search	Reason for designation		Area^{[ a]}		Grid reference	Year in which notified	Map^{[B]}
Site name	Area of Search	Biological interest	Geological interest	Hectares	Acres	Grid reference	Year in which notified	Map^{[B]}
Upper Severn Estuary	Gloucestershire	✓		1,436.8	3,550.4	SO720060	1954	Map
Tamar - Tavy Estuary	Cornwall / Devon	✓		1,422.3	3,514.6	SX474650	1991	
Hatfield Moors	South Yorkshire	✓		1,400.7	3,461.2	SE705060	1954	
Avon Valley (Bickton to Christchurch)	Dorset / Hampshire	✓		1,383.7	3,419.2	TU147123	1974	
Braunton Burrows	Devon	✓	✓	1,356.7	3,352.5	SS430350	1952	
Taw-Torridge Estuary	Devon	✓		1,336.5	3,302.6	SS470310	1981	
Nene Washes	Cambridgeshire	✓		1,310.0	3,237.1	TL200977	1959	
Portsmouth Harbour	Hampshire	✓		1,266.1	3,128.6	SU620035	1974	
East Devon Pebblebed Heaths	Devon	✓		1,111.9	2,747.6	SY050880	1952	
Catcott, Edington and Chilton Moors	Somerset	✓		1,083.0	2,676.2	ST390420	1967	Map
West Sedgemoor	Somerset	✓		1,016.0	2,510.6	ST361258	1983	Map
Haldon Forest	Devon	✓		1,013.2	2,503.7	SX886838	1992	Map

== Sites more than 750 hectares in size ==
Site name	Area of Search	Reason for designation		Area^{[ a]}		Grid reference	Year in which notified	Map^{[B]}
Site name	Area of Search	Biological interest	Geological interest	Hectares	Acres	Grid reference	Year in which notified	Map^{[B]}
Chesil and the Fleet	Dorset	✓	✓	990.4	2,447.3	SY496885	1952	
Fenn's, Whixall, Bettisfield, Wem and Cadney Mosses	Shropshire / Wales	✓		948.4	2,343.5	SJ490365	1953	
Tealham and Tadham Moors	Somerset	✓		917.6	2,267.4	ST420450	1985	Map
Savernake Forest	Wiltshire	✓		904.7	2,235.6	SU215665	1971	Map
King's Sedgemoor	Somerset	✓		822.0	2,031.2	ST400330	1985	
Grafham Water	Cambridgeshire	✓		811.9	2,006.2	TL150680	1986	
Durham Coast	Cleveland / Durham	✓	✓	765.4	1,891.3	NZ400500	1960	
Rye Harbour	East Sussex	✓	✓	761.1	1,880.7	TQ935180	1953	Map
Studland and Godlingston Heath	Dorset	✓	✓	758.9	1,875.3	SZ030845	1954	

== Sites more than 500 hectares in size ==
Site name	Area of Search	Reason for designation		Area^{[ a]}		Grid reference	Year in which notified	Map^{[B]}
Site name	Area of Search	Biological interest	Geological interest	Hectares	Acres	Grid reference	Year in which notified	Map^{[B]}
Blue Anchor to Lilstock Coast	Somerset		✓	742.8	1,835.5	ST033435	1971	
Abberton Reservoir	Essex	✓		716.3	1,770.0	TL970180	1955	
Lynher Estuary	Cornwall	✓		687.3	1,698.4	SX375565	1951	
North Moor	Somerset	✓		676.3	1,671.2	ST325305	1986	
Cotswold Commons And Beechwoods	Gloucestershire	✓		665.5	1,644.5	SP900130	1954	Map
Bentley Wood	Wiltshire / Hampshire	✓		665.0	1,643.3	SU250295	1985	Map
Barle Valley	Somerset	✓		622.9	1,539.2	SS850349	1954	
Pagham Harbour	West Sussex	✓	✓	615.9	1,521.9	SZ875970	1954	
Upper Fal estuary and woodlands	Cornwall	✓		603.5	1,491.3	SW850410	1968	
Chew Valley Lake	Avon	✓		565.2	1,396.6	ST570600	1971	
Arne	Dorset	✓	✓	563.4	1,392.2	ST966880	1986	
Westhay Moor	Somerset	✓		513.7	1,269.4	ST455445	1971	Map
Breydon Water	Norfolk	✓		506.5	1,251.6	TG500075	1987	Map

== Sites more than 400 hectares in size ==
Site name	Area of Search	Reason for designation		Area^{[ a]}		Grid reference	Year in which notified	Map^{[B]}
Site name	Area of Search	Biological interest	Geological interest	Hectares	Acres	Grid reference	Year in which notified	Map^{[B]}
Wet Moor	Somerset	✓		491.0	1,213.3	ST448244	1985	Map
Curry and Hay Moors	Somerset	✓		472.8	1,168.3	ST323273	1992	Map
Dunster Park and Heathlands	Somerset	✓		466.6	1,153.0	SS955441	2000	Map
Cranborne Chase	Dorset / Wiltshire	✓		451.4	1,115.4	ST970180	1975	Map
Cheddar Complex	Somerset	✓	✓	441.3	1,090.5	ST465538	1952	Map
Blithfield Reservoir	Staffordshire	✓		435.6	1,076.4	SK057242	1968	
Winterton to Horsey Dunes	Norfolk	✓	✓	427.2	1,055.6	ST490210	1954	
Wytham Woods	Oxfordshire	✓		426.5	1,053.9	SP462083	1950	

== Sites more than 300 hectares in size ==
Site name	Area of Search	Reason for designation		Area^{[ a]}		Grid reference	Year in which notified	Map^{[B]}
Site name	Area of Search	Biological interest	Geological interest	Hectares	Acres	Grid reference	Year in which notified	Map^{[B]}
Bratton Downs	Wiltshire	✓	✓	395.8	978.0	ST925522	1971	Map
Shapwick Heath	Somerset	✓		394.0	973.6	ST430403	1967	Map
South Gare and Coatham Sands	Cleveland	✓		381.2	942.0	NZ582263	1971	
Isle of Portland	Dorset	✓	✓	369.3	912.6	SY690722	1952	
Christchurch Harbour	Dorset	✓	✓	353.2	872.8	SZ175915	1964	
Lundy	Devon	✓		345.0	852.5	SS135460	1976	
Axmouth to Lyme Regis Undercliffs	Devon / ?	✓	✓	334.6	826.8	SY300900	1952	
Crook Peak to Shute Shelve Hill	Somerset	✓	✓	332.2	820.9	ST385555	1952	Map
Fyfield Down	Wiltshire	✓	✓	325.3	803.8	SU136709	1951	Map
Seaton Dunes And Common	Cleveland	✓		312.1	771.2	NZ535285	1966	
Pewsey Downs	Wiltshire	✓		305.3	754.4	SU113636	1951	Map

== Sites more than 250 hectares in size ==
Site name	Area of Search	Reason for designation		Area^{[ a]}		Grid reference	Year in which notified	Map^{[B]}
Site name	Area of Search	Biological interest	Geological interest	Hectares	Acres	Grid reference	Year in which notified	Map^{[B]}
Church Wood, Blean	Kent	✓		297.1	734.2	TR109603	1951	
Seal Sands	Cleveland	✓		294.4	727.5	NZ529260	1966	
Lower Woods	Avon	✓	✓	280.1	692.1	ST743876	1966	
Greenham and Crookham Commons	Berkshire	✓		278.6	688.4	SU490645 & SU523643	1985	
Lower Fal & Helford Intertidal	Cornwall	✓		277.7	686.2	SW860334	1997	
Tees and Hartlepool Foreshore and Wetlands	Cleveland	✓		255.6	631.6	NZ516348 & NZ505224	1997	
Skipwith Common	North Yorkshire	✓		274	677.1	SE668362	1958	
Slapton Ley	Devon	✓	✓	254.7	629.4	SX826440	2004	

== Sites more than 200 hectares in size ==
Site name	Area of Search	Reason for designation		Area^{[ a]}		Grid reference	Year in which notified	Map^{[B]}
Site name	Area of Search	Biological interest	Geological interest	Hectares	Acres	Grid reference	Year in which notified	Map^{[B]}
Longleat Woods	Somerset	✓		249.9	617.5	ST795435	1972	Map
Mottisfont Bats	Hampshire	✓		231.0	570.8	SU314281	2003	
Moorlinch	Somerset	✓		226.0	558.5	ST390360	1985	Map
West Moor	Somerset	✓		213.0	526.3	ST420220	1985	Map
Otmoor	Oxfordshire	✓		211.6	522.9	SP575130	1952	
Blagdon Lake	Avon	✓		212.7	525.6	ST515597	1971	
Ashton Court	Avon	✓		210.3	519.7	ST553723	1998	

== Sites more than 150 hectares in size ==
Site name	Area of Search	Reason for designation		Area^{[ a]}		Grid reference	Year in which notified	Map^{[B]}
Site name	Area of Search	Biological interest	Geological interest	Hectares	Acres	Grid reference	Year in which notified	Map^{[B]}
Berrow Dunes	Somerset	✓		200.0	494.2	ST293520	1952	
Southlake Moor	Somerset	✓		196.1	484.6	ST370300	1985	Map
Brimsdown Hill	Wiltshire	✓		193.7	478.6	SU831385	1951	Map
Porlock Ridge and Saltmarsh	Somerset	✓	✓	186.3	460.4	SS880479	1990	Map
Langmead and Weston Level	Somerset	✓		168.8	417.1	ST353330	1991	
Gordano Valley	Avon	✓	✓	161.7	399.6	ST435730	1971	
East Blean Woods	Kent	✓		156.8	387.5	TR189640	1981	
St. Catherine's Valley	Avon	✓		156.1	385.7	ST760725	1997	
Avon Gorge	Avon	✓	✓	155.4	384.0	ST560743	1952	
Black Down and Sampford Commons	Somerset	✓		155.2	383.5	ST118161	1952	
Brimble Pit and Cross Swallet Basins	Somerset		✓	154.3	381.3	ST512505	1987	

== Sites more than 100 hectares in size ==
Site name	Area of Search	Reason for designation		Area^{[ a]}		Grid reference	Year in which notified	Map^{[B]}
Site name	Area of Search	Biological interest	Geological interest	Hectares	Acres	Grid reference	Year in which notified	Map^{[B]}
Attenborough Nature Reserve	Nottinghamshire	✓		226.6	559.9	SK514338	1982	Map
Asham Wood	Somerset	✓		141.6	349.9	ST705460	1963	
Burrington Combe	Avon / North Somerset	✓	✓	139.1	343.7	ST478583	1952	
Wenlock Edge	Shropshire	✓	✓	136.8	338.0	SO606995	1954	
Tickenham, Nailsea and Kenn Moors	Avon	✓		129.4	319.8	ST440700	1995	
Bowerchalke Downs	Wiltshire	✓		128.6	317.8	SU004218	1971	Map
Calstone And Cherhill Downs	Wiltshire	✓		128.6	317.8	SU047692	1971	Map
King's Wood and Urchin Wood	Avon	✓		128.1	316.5	ST454645	1990	
East Polden Grasslands	Somerset	✓		124.0	306.4	ST474325	1999	Map
Upper Fowey Valley	Cornwall	✓		124.0	306.4	SX215730	1989	
Potteric Carr	South Yorkshire	✓		119.6	295.5	SE599003	1977	
Cowpen Marsh	Cleveland	✓		116.8	288.6	NZ500529	1966	
River Kennet	Berkshire / Wiltshire	✓		112.7	278.5	SU203692	1995	Map
Cheddar Reservoir	Somerset	✓		105.4	260.4	ST441537	1972	Map
River Barle	Somerset	✓		104.2	257.5	SS723423	1997	Map
Dozmary Pool	Cornwall	✓	✓	104.2	257.5	SX195745	1986	
Prior's Park & Adcombe Wood	Somerset	✓		103.6	256.0	ST225170	1952	Map

== Notes ==
^{a} Data rounded to one decimal place.
^{B} Link to maps using the Nature on the Map service provided by English Nature.
