= Seal Sands =

SSSI and chemical plant in County Durham, England

- Location within County Durham
- Location: County Durham, England
- Coordinates: 54°37′36″N 1°10′47″W
- Area: 294.4 ha (727 acres)
- Established: 1966
- Governing body: Natural England
- Website: Map of site

Seal Sands (grid reference NZ529260) is a 294.37 hectare biological Site of Special Scientific Interest in County Durham, England, notified in 1966.

Situated in the mouth of the River Tees next to Greatham Creek and Seaton-on-Tees Channel, the site is accessible from the A178 road running between Seaton Carew and Port Clarence.

SSSIs are designated by Natural England, formerly English Nature, which uses the 1974–1996 county system. This means there is no grouping of SSSIs by Stockton-on-Tees unitary authority, or County Durham which is the relevant ceremonial county. As such Seal Sands is one of 18 SSSIs in the Cleveland area of search.

An area of reclaimed land is given over to chemical industries.

== Chemical industries site ==
On land recovered from the sea, an area of Seal Sands is used as an industrial park for the chemical industry. Members of the Northeast of England Process Industry Cluster (NEPIC) using the site include: Ineos, Fine Organics, Central Area Transmission System (BP Group), SABIC, Vertellus, ConocoPhillips, Vopak, Simon Storage, Intertek Caleb Brett, Harvest Operations. Both Greenergy and Air Products abandoned their plans to each operate a plasma gasification waste-to-energy facility at Seal Sands.

== See also ==
Nearby

- Seaton Dunes and Common SSSI
- Tees and Hartlepool Foreshore and Wetlands SSSI
- River Tees
- Hartlepool nuclear power station
- Able UK
- Northeast of England Process Industry Cluster
- Seal Sands Power Station

== Sources ==
- English Nature citation sheet for the site (accessed 5 August 2006).
