= Tees and Hartlepool Foreshore and Wetlands SSSI =

Protected area in County Durham, England

Tees and Hartlepool Foreshore and Wetlands
- Interactive map of Tees and Hartlepool Foreshore and Wetlands
- Location: County Durham, England
- Area: 255.6 ha (632 acres)
- Established: 1997
- Governing body: Natural England
- Website: Map of site

Tees and Hartlepool Foreshore and Wetlands SSSI is a 255.62-hectare (631.7-acre) biological Site of Special Scientific Interest in County Durham, England notified in 1997.

SSSIs are designated by Natural England, formally English Nature, which uses the 1974–1996 county system. This means there is no grouping of SSSIs by Hartlepool unitary authority, or County Durham which is the relevant ceremonial county . As such this area is one of 18 SSSIs in the Cleveland area of search.

It consists of two disjunct areas - foreshore (grid reference NZ516348) and wetlands (grid reference NZ505224), and forms a complex of wetland SSSIs along with Cowpen Marsh, Seal Sands and South Gare and Coatham Sands. Parts of the SSSI are in the Teesmouth National Nature Reserve.

== Birds ==
Tees and Hartlepool Foreshore and Wetlands SSSI is an important wintering site for waders and wildfowl and supports nationally important populations of purple sandpiper, sanderling and Northern shoveler. Surveys have demonstrated that numbersof other birds, making up significant portions of the Tees estuary's populations, frequently use parts of the SSI for foraging and roosting. These include sanderling, red knot, purple sandpiper and ruddy turnstone on the north Hartlepool shore and Hartlepool Headland; while common redshank, Eurasian curlew, Eurasian teal and common shelduck use Greenabella Marsh; northern shoveler, Eurasian teal, Eurasian wigeon, gadwall, Northern lapwing and European golden plover use both Saltholme Pool and Dormans Pools; and common redshank and common shelduck on the North Tees mudflats.

== Sources ==
- English Nature citation sheet for the site (accessed 6 August 2006)
