= List of Sites of Special Scientific Interest in Cleveland =

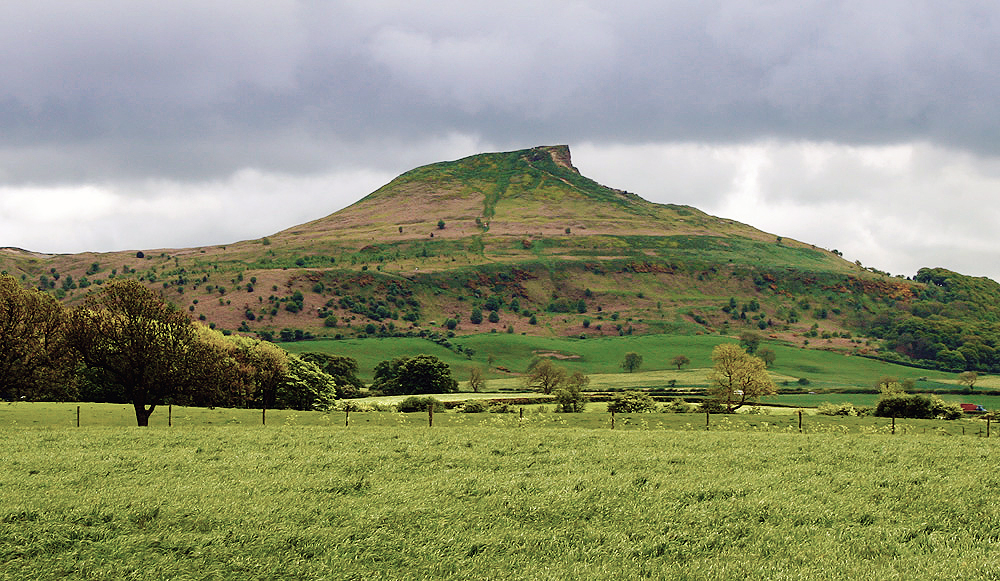
Roseberry Topping, a site in Cleveland designated as a geological SSSI

This is a list of the Sites of Special Scientific Interest (SSSIs) in Cleveland, England, United Kingdom. In England the body responsible for designating SSSIs is Natural England, which chooses a site because of its fauna, flora, geological or physiographical features. As of 2021, there are 18 sites designated within this Area of Search, of which 12 have been designated due to their biological interest, 4 due to their geological interest, and 2 (Durham Coast and Redcar Rocks) for both.

Natural England took over the role of designating and managing SSSIs from English Nature in October 2006 when it was formed from the amalgamation of English Nature, parts of the Countryside Agency and the Rural Development Service. The English counties were revised under the 1974 reorganisation of local government. Until the 2010s, Natural England, which maintains the database of English SSSIs, kept the listing of counties as it was in 1974, but by 2015 it had updated the lists to reflect some later changes. However, even though Cleveland was abolished in 1996 it is still used as an area of search by Natural England, rather than being divided between the County Durham and North Yorkshire lists.

The data in the table is taken from Natural England's website in the form of citation sheets for each SSSI.

For other counties, see List of SSSIs by Area of Search.

== Sites ==
Site name	Reason for designation		Area^{[A]}		Grid reference^{[B]}	Year in which notified	Map^{[C]}
Site name	Biological interest	Geological interest	Hectares	Acres	Grid reference^{[B]}	Year in which notified	Map^{[C]}
Boulby Quarries		✓	40.3	99.6	NZ745200	1989	Map
Briarcroft Pasture	✓		1.8	4.3	NZ394193	2004	Map
Cowpen Marsh	✓		116.8	288.6	NZ500529	1966	Map
Durham Coast^{[D]}	✓	✓	765.4	1,891.4	NZ381685 – NZ495362	1960	Map
Hart Bog	✓		1.8	4.4	NZ452354	1968	Map
Hartlepool Submerged Forest		✓	19.7	48.6	NZ520315	1988	Map
Langbaurgh Ridge		✓	7.0	17.5	NZ560121	1986	Map
Lovell Hill Pools	✓		9.2	22.7	NZ596189	1999	Map
North York Moors^{[E]}	✓		44,087.7	108,940.7	NZ680000	1998	Map
Pinkney and Gerrick Woods	✓		62.7	154.9	NZ708138	1954	Map
Redcar Rocks	✓	✓	31.1	76.8	NZ612203	1984	Map
Roseberry Topping		✓	10.9	26.8	NZ579126	1954	Map
Saltburn Gill	✓		18.9	46.7	NZ676205	1986	Map
Seal Sands	✓		294.4	727.4	NZ529260	1966	Map
Seaton Dunes and Common	✓		312.1	771.2	NZ535285	1966	Map
South Gare and Coatham Sands	✓		381.2	941.9	NZ582263	1971	Map
Tees and Hartlepool Foreshore and Wetlands	✓		255.6	631.7	NZ516348 & NZ505224	1997	Map
Whitton Bridge Pasture	✓		3.2	7.9	NZ385222	2004	Map

== Notes ==
^{A} Data rounded to one decimal place.
^{B} Grid reference is based on the British national grid reference system, also known as OSGB36, and is the system used by the Ordnance Survey.
^{C} Link to maps using the Nature on the Map service provided by Natural England.
^{D} The Durham Coast site extends into two other counties and so can be found on lists of SSSIs in County Durham and Tyne and Wear.
^{E} The North York Moors site extends into the county of North Yorkshire and so can be found on the list of SSSIs in North Yorkshire.
