= Redcar Rocks =

Protected area in North Yorkshire, England

- Location within North Yorkshire
- Location: Redcar and Cleveland, North Yorkshire, England
- Coordinates: 54°37′7″N 1°2′54″W
- Area: 31.1 ha (77 acres)
- Established: 1984
- Governing body: Natural England
- Website: Map of site

Redcar Rocks (grid reference NZ612203) is a 31.1 hectare biological and geological Site of Special Scientific Interest in North Yorkshire, England notified in 1984.

SSSIs are designated by Natural England, formally English Nature, which uses the 1974–1996 county system. This means there is no grouping of SSSIs by Redcar and Cleveland unitary authority, or North Yorkshire which is the relevant ceremonial county . As such Briarcroft Pasture is one of 18 SSSIs in the Cleveland area of search.

== Land ownership ==
All land within Redcar Rocks SSSI is owned by the local authority.

== Sources ==
- English Nature citation sheet for the site (accessed 6 August 2006)
