= Hart Bog =

- Location within County Durham
- Location: Hartlepool, North East, England
- Coordinates: 54°42′43″N 1°17′51″W
- Area: 1.79 ha (4.4 acres)
- Established: 1968
- Governing body: Natural England
- Website: Map of site

Hart Bog (grid reference NZ452354) is a 1.79 hectare biological Site of Special Scientific Interest in County Durham, England notified in 1968.

SSSIs are designated by Natural England, formally English Nature, which uses the 1974–1996 county system. This means there is no grouping of SSSIs by Hartlepool unitary authority or County Durham, the relevant ceremonial county. As such Hart Bog is one of 18 SSSIs in the Cleveland area of search.

== Sources ==
- English Nature citation sheet for the site (accessed 5 August 2006)
