= Lovell Hill Pools =

Protected area in North Yorkshire, England

- Location within North Yorkshire
- Location: Redcar and Cleveland, North Yorkshire, England
- Coordinates: 54°33′44″N 1°4′39″W
- Area: 9.2 ha (23 acres)
- Established: 1999
- Governing body: Natural England
- Website: Map of site

Lovell Hill Pools (grid reference NZ596189) is a 9.2 hectare biological Site of Special Scientific Interest (SSSI) in North Yorkshire, England notified in 1999.

SSSIs are designated by Natural England, formally English Nature, which uses the 1974–1996 county system. This means there is no grouping of SSSIs by Redcar and Cleveland unitary authority, or North Yorkshire which is the relevant ceremonial county. As such Lovell Hill Pools is one of 18 SSSIs in the Cleveland area of search.

== Sources ==
- English Nature citation sheet for the site (accessed 5 August 2006)
