= Pinkney and Gerrick Woods =

Protected area in North Yorkshire, England

- Location within North Yorkshire
- Location: Redcar and Cleveland, North Yorkshire, England
- Coordinates: 54°30′54″N 0°54′20″W
- Area: 62.7 ha (155 acres)
- Established: 1954
- Governing body: Natural England
- Website: Map of site

Pinkney And Gerrick Woods (grid reference NZ708138) is a 62.7 hectare biological Site of Special Scientific Interest in North Yorkshire, England notified in 1954.

SSSIs are designated by Natural England, formally English Nature, which uses the 1974–1996 county system. This means there is no grouping of SSSIs by Redcar and Cleveland unitary authority, or North Yorkshire which is the relevant ceremonial county. As such Pinkney and Gerrick Woods is one of 18 SSSIs in the Cleveland area of search.

== Sources ==
- English Nature citation sheet for the site (accessed 6 August 2006)
