= Seaton Carew =

Seaside resort in County Durham, England

Coordinates: 54.662774°N 1.188819°W

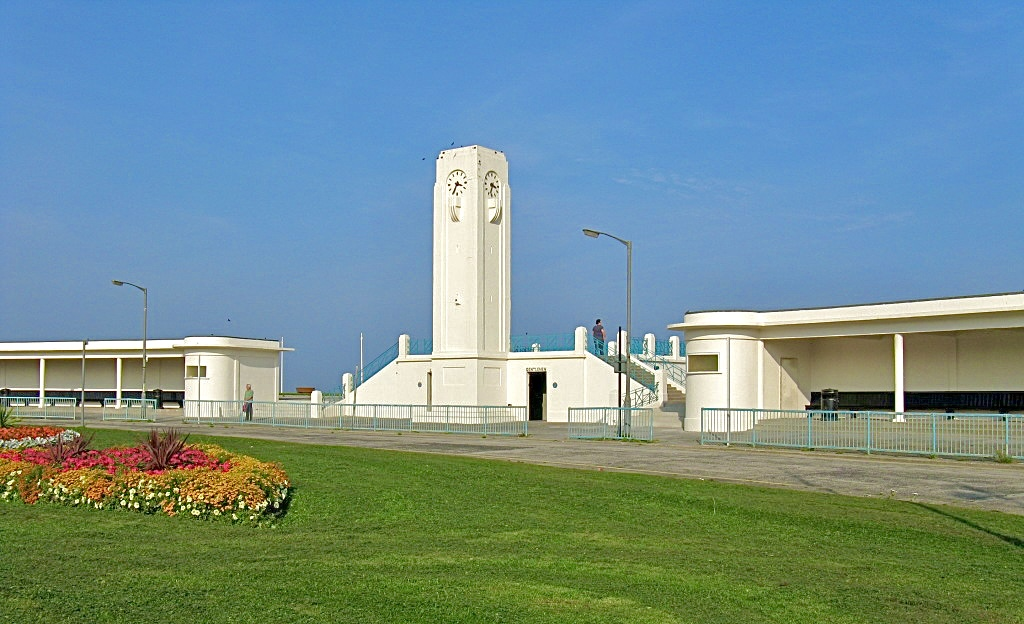
- The bus station

- Location within County Durham
- Population: 6,018 (2001)
- OS grid reference: NZ52323006
- Unitary authority: Hartlepool
- Ceremonial county: Durham
- Region: North East
- Country: England
- Sovereign state: United Kingdom
- Post town: HARTLEPOOL
- Postcode district: TS25
- Dialling code: 01429
- Police: Cleveland
- Fire: Cleveland
- Ambulance: North East
- UK Parliament: Hartlepool

Seaton Carew /kəˈruː/ is a seaside resort in the Borough of Hartlepool in County Durham, England. It gives its name to the Seaton ward, which had an estimated population of 7,194 in 2021. It is deemed part of the Hartlepool built-up area by the Office for National Statistics, but is separated from the main part of the urban area by the Durham Coast Line. The resort is on the North Sea coast and north of the River Tees estuary.

The area was first recorded in the 12th century as owned by a family "de Carou" (of Carew),

== History ==
There is evidence that the area was occupied in Roman times as vestiges of Roman buildings, coins and artefacts are occasionally found on the beach. Later during the reign of Henry I, Seaton came into the possession of Robert De Carrowe and the settlement changed its name to Seaton Carrowe. In medieval times salt was extracted from sea water by evaporation and ash from the fuel used to remove the water was dumped on North Gare and now forms a series of grass covered mounds on the golf course. A Gilbertine priory or cell to Sempringham Priory was established in the Seaton area although so far no trace has been found. In 1667 a gun fortification was built on the promontory of Seaton Snook to defend the mouth of the Tees, particularly against the Dutch—remnants of these fortifications can be seen today.

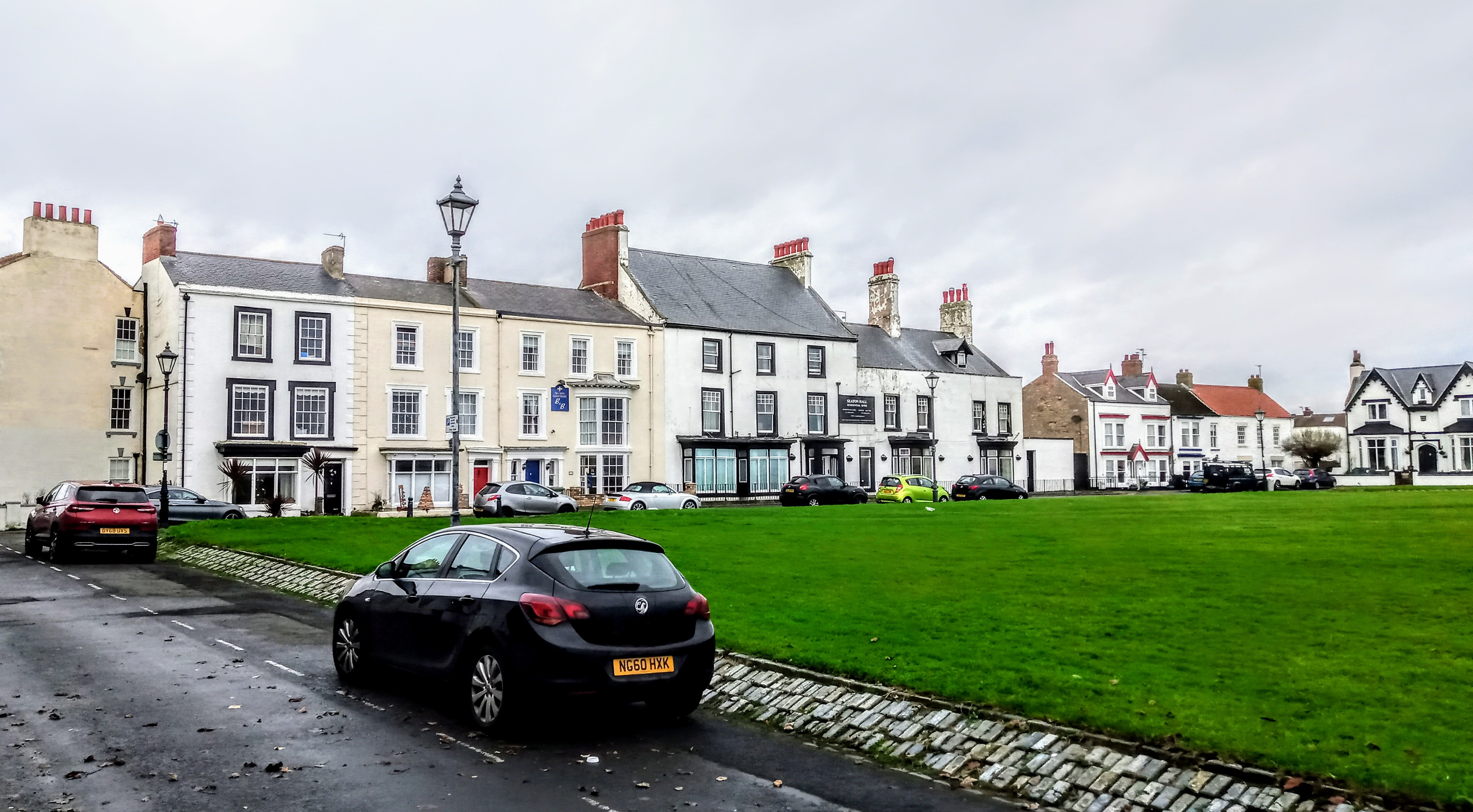
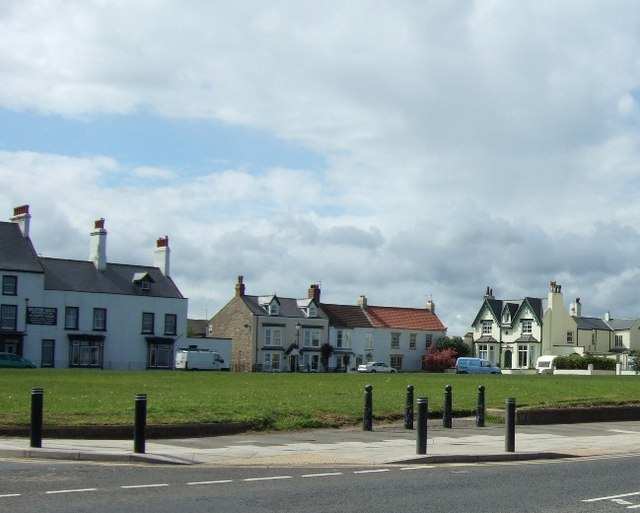
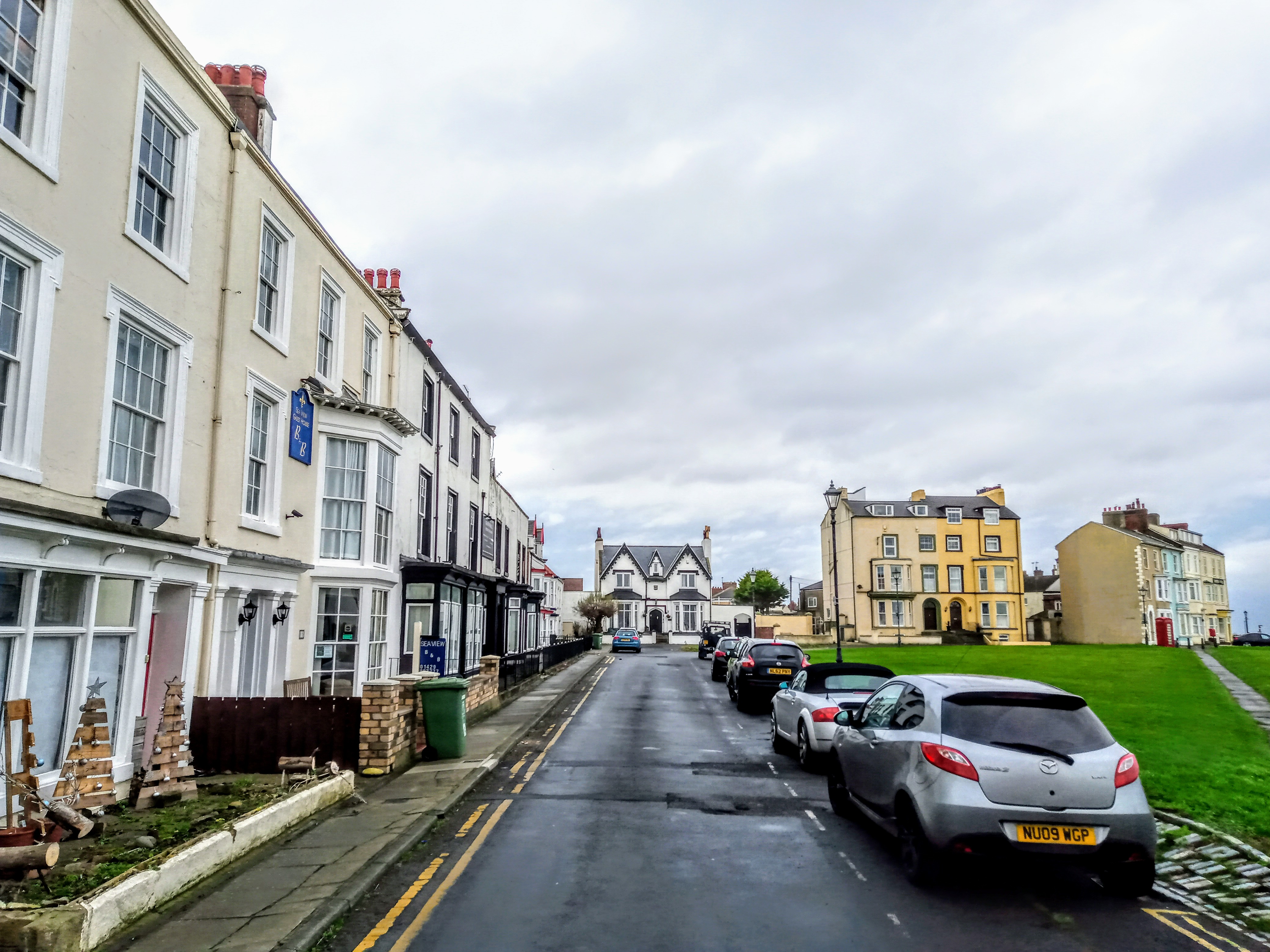
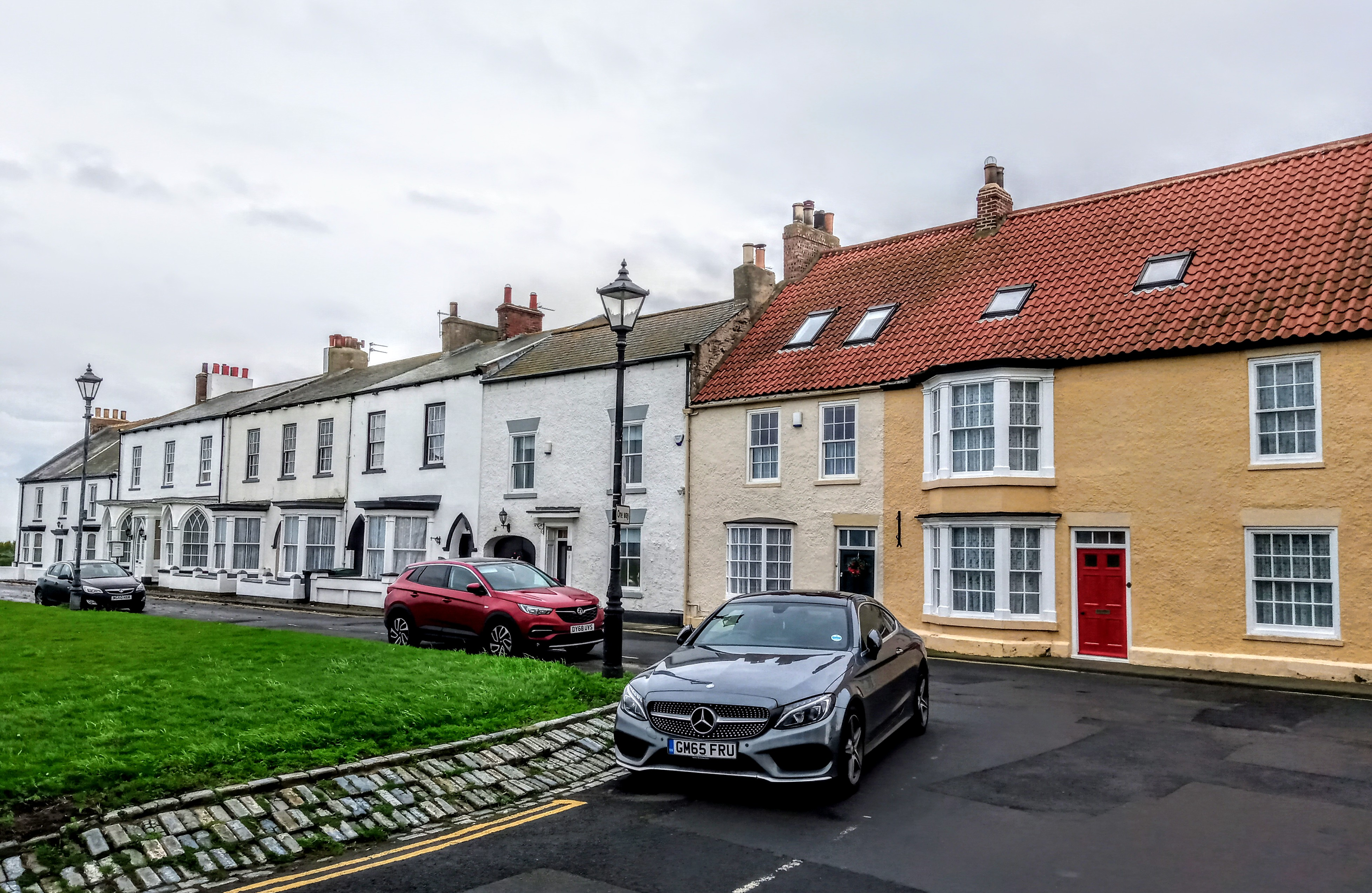
The Green

Seaton Carew was a fishing village but grew in the eighteenth and nineteenth centuries as a seaside holiday resort for wealthy Quaker families from Darlington, effectively founding Seaton Carew as a seaside resort. Many stayed at the rows of stucco houses and hotels built along the seafront and around The Green—a turfed square facing the sea.

In 1867 a hoard of Spanish silver dollars was revealed in the sands following a heavy storm.

In 1874 the Durham and Yorkshire Golf Club (now Seaton Carew Golf Club) was founded by Duncan McCuaig, with a 14-hole course on coastal land to the south-east of Seaton Carew. Four holes were added in 1891 and in 1925 further work was carried out with the guidance of renowned golf course designer Alister MacKenzie.

The Museum of Hartlepool records that a small riot involving Irish labourers took place in the late Victorian era, when townsfolk mistook them for Fenian agitators.

Just north of Seaton was the works of the West Hartlepool Steel & Iron Company. In 1898 Christopher Furness and W.C. Gray of West Hartlepool purchased the Stockton Malleable Iron Works, the Moor Steel and Iron Works, and the West Hartlepool Steel and Iron Works to form the South Durham Steel and Iron Company. This became part of the British Steel Corporation in 1967. The West Hartlepool Steel and Iron Works is thought to have closed in 1979.

=== Lighthouse ===
In 1838, under increasing commercial pressure from the docks at West Hartlepool, the Tees Navigation Company decided to improve access to the river Tees by providing a pair of leading lighthouses (navigation light towers) on the coast at Seaton Carew.

The Low Light was on what is now Coronation Drive on the sea front at the junction with Lawson Road. The High Light and cottages were 1,189 yards (1,087 m) inland to the west at the end of Windermere Road, what is now the Longhill Industrial Estate in Hartlepool north of Tees Bay Retail Park.

The lighthouse was decommissioned by the Tees Conservancy Commissioners in 1892 and the building is believed to have been demolished in 1902.

=== 20th century ===
An electric tramway track extension from Church Street, Hartlepool to Seaton Carew was opened on 28 March 1902 linking Hartlepool and Seaton Carew. Trams travelled on reserved track along parts of Seaton Carew sea front, operating until 25 March 1927 when the line closed, ending tram transport in the Hartlepools.

During a northerly gale in the early hours of 31 January 1907 the cargo steamship SS Clavering became stranded near North Gare breakwater in the mouth of the river Tees. During a 31-hour joint rescue the Seaton Carew and Hartlepool lifeboats removed a total of 39 people from the vessel—the RNLI subsequently awarded Silver Medals to coxswain Shepherd Sotheran and John Franklin, coxswain superintendent of the Seaton Carew Lifeboat.

On North Gare at the end of Zinc Works Road was a zinc smelter built from 1907 to 1908 by the Central Zinc Company. This works imported zinc concentrates – tailings from the froth flotation process produced at Broken Hill, New South Wales, Australia. The mineral was roasted to produce zinc, lead and silver with sulphuric acid as one of the by-products. Brimstone could also be burnt to improve the yield of sulphuric acid. In 1916 the Central Zinc Company sold the works to The Sulphide Corporation. In 1933 the Seaton Carew Zinc and Acid plant was acquired from The Sulphide Corporation by The Imperial Smelting Corporation.

==== World War One ====
From 1916 to 1919 there was an RFC / RAF airstrip on open land to the south of Seaton Carew at the southern end of Brenda Road near what is now Hunter Houses Industrial Estate, and seaplanes (float planes) were kept in Seaton Channel. This was a detachment of No. 36 Home Defence Squadron of the Royal Flying Corps located at RFC Station Cramlington, in Northumberland charged with the defence of the North East and Yorkshire coast.

During the First World War a group of four Zeppelins attacked targets on the northeast coast. After bombing Hartlepool the L 34 was caught in a searchlight to the west of Hartlepool, and Lieutenant Ian Vernon Pyott the pilot of a BE 2C biplane from A flight No. 36 Squadron based at Seaton Carew, on seeing the Zeppelin at about ten thousand feet gave chase for five miles, occasionally firing on the craft. The L 34 caught fire and, engulfed in flames, fell into the sea in Tees Bay with the loss of all crew while the other Zeppelins made their escape—flames were seen as far away as Melton Mowbray. In February 1921 a war memorial in the form of a Victoria Cross upon a shaft was unveiled and dedicated on The Green.

==== Inter-war ====
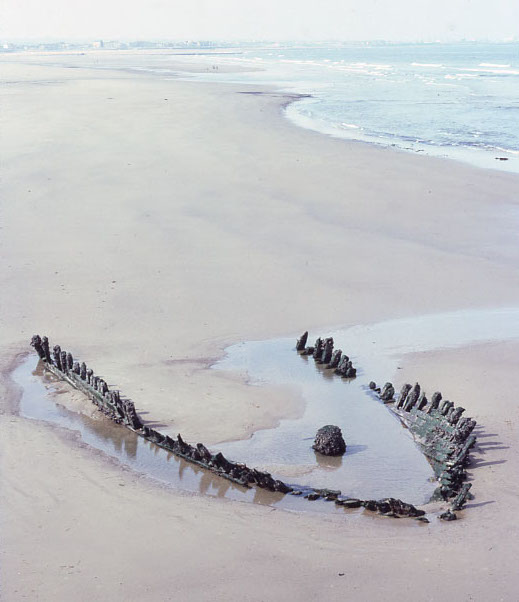
The wreck of the Danish schooner Doris at North Gare (1983)

On 26 September 1930 the Danish schooner Doris was driven towards Longscar Rocks off Hartlepool, dragging her anchors in a gale and heavy seas. Nine of the crew were rescued by the Hartlepool Lifeboat but the Doris became a total wreck and after salvage its remains are now embedded in the sands at North Gare.

In the 1930s, shelters were built for the seaside visitor. Opposite The Green was the North Shelter and behind the bus station the South shelter, both with toilets and a life guard. Both shelters were demolished towards the end of the 20th Century because of their crumbling condition. During the Second World War defences were put in place on the beach to prevent invasion--barbed wire, mines and sentries.

==== Post-war ====
In northern Seaton Carew in 1949 a large fire broke out in a timber yard of imported Scandinavian timber intended for making into pit props for the Durham Coalfield. This was similar to an event that occurred in 1922.

In 1969 the Seaton Carew Conservation Area was created and extended in 1976 and 2002.

In recent regeneration work the crumbling sea-front baths and the North and South shelters have been demolished and the bus station renewed. The sea defences to the north have been strengthened with rock armour on the upper beach to subdue wave action and the promenade has been extended northwards to Hartlepool Marina.

=== 21st century ===
The area gained press attention in December 2007 when John Darwin, believed dead since an apparent canoeing accident off Seaton Beach in 2002, walked into a London police station and gave himself up as a missing person, sparking a major fraud investigation by Cleveland Police. Following these events, a local prankster erected a road sign near the railway station on Seaton Lane saying "Welcome to Seaton Canoe - Twinned with Panama" — it was quickly removed by Hartlepool Town Council.

=== Administrative history ===
Seaton Carew was historically a township in the ancient parish of Stranton. Such townships were also made civil parishes from 1866. A local government district covering the more urban north of the township, including the village, was created in 1866, governed by a local board. The district was abolished in 1883, being absorbed into the neighbouring district of West Hartlepool, which was subsequently incorporated as a borough in 1887. Under the Local Government Act 1894 parishes were no longer allowed to straddle borough boundaries, and so the civil parish of Seaton Carew was reduced to just cover the part of the old township within the borough of West Hartlepool; the more rural southern part of the township was made a separate parish called Seaton. As an urban parish, Seaton Carew did not have its own parish council, but was directly administered by the borough council. The parish of Seaton Carew was abolished on 1 April 1921 when the urban parishes within the borough were merged into a single parish. In 1911 the parish had a population of 2265. It is now in the unparished area of Hartlepool.

The rural parish of Seaton continued to exist until 1967 when it and West Hartlepool merged with the older borough of Hartlepool.

== Economy ==
Tourism

Tourists and visitors are attracted to the resort's four miles of sandy beach, promenade, arcades, and fish and chip restaurants. The beach is regularly cleaned and is patrolled by lifeguards during the summer holidays. In 2019 the main beach was given an 'excellent' bathing rating by the Environment Agency, and was granted a Seaside Award by environmental charity Keep Britain Tidy.

Industry

At the end of Zinc Works Road there is a quarry at North Gare at one time owned by Tarmac, used for the extraction of sand and gravel from the beach of North Gare Sands by the lagoon at Teesmouth. Also at the end of Zinc Works Road is Frutarom, formerly Oxford Chemicals, manufacturers of "High Impact Aroma Chemicals" for the food and other industries.

To the south on Seaton Channel is Hartlepool Nuclear Power Station. Further up Seaton Channel at Graythorp basin, Able UK have their ship dismantling facility and on Tees Road is the Greatham Works of Huntsman Tioxide manufacturers of titanium dioxide pigments. The chemical companies based in Seaton Carew are in the footprint of the Northeast of England Process Industry Cluster (NEPIC). These industries lie at the mouth of the River Tees which is home to Teesport, operated by PD Ports and the third largest sea port in the United Kingdom.

== Culture and filmography ==
Every November on a Saturday closest to Bonfire Night there is a fireworks display, often with entertainment and children's attractions, which draws thousands of visitors from across the region.

Seaton Carew features in science fiction writer Mark Adlard's 'T-city' trilogy and the bus station features in several scenes in the Mike Leigh film Career Girls. HMS Seaton Carew is a (fictitious) space vessel that appeared in an episode the BBC 2 TV series Hyperdrive.

In episode 9 of season 10 of the hit TV show Top Gear, the introduction to the Stig included the line "Some say that he once lost a canoe on a beach in the north east..," which was a satirical reference to the John Darwin incident in Seaton Carew.

== Landmarks ==
On the coast in the north of Seaton, a promenade now allows visitors to walk from Seaton Carew to Hartlepool Marina. This promenade gives unrestricted views across the North Sea and on a clear day offers views almost as far as Whitby.

Along the coastline is the Hartlepool Submerged Forest, a Site of Special Scientific Interest. To the south, close to the slipway is the old lifeboat station—now living accommodation. In the south of Seaton Carew, along "The Front", are the shops, restaurants, cafes, chip shops and arcades that might be expected of a seaside resort.

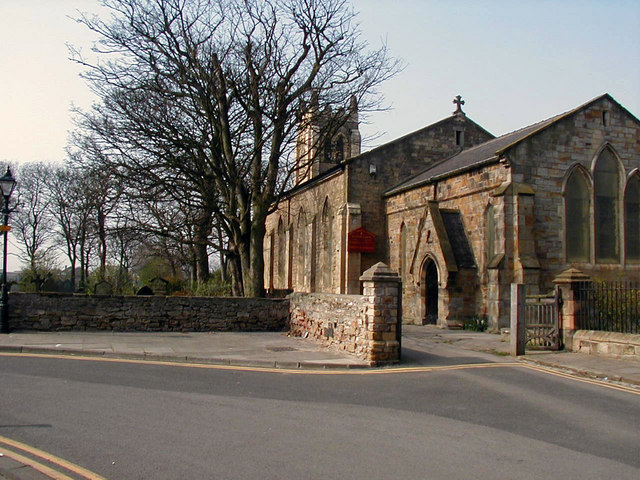
Holy Trinity Church

Holy Trinity Church, formerly a chapel, in the middle of the village was consecrated in 1831 giving the village its first proper school. The church was restored in 1891.

The listed buildings in Seaton Carew are the Church of the Holy Trinity on Church Street, the bus station and shelters, Marine Hotel, and Seaton Hotel on The Front, houses in South End and a telephone kiosk, various hotels and private houses around The Green including Green Terrace.

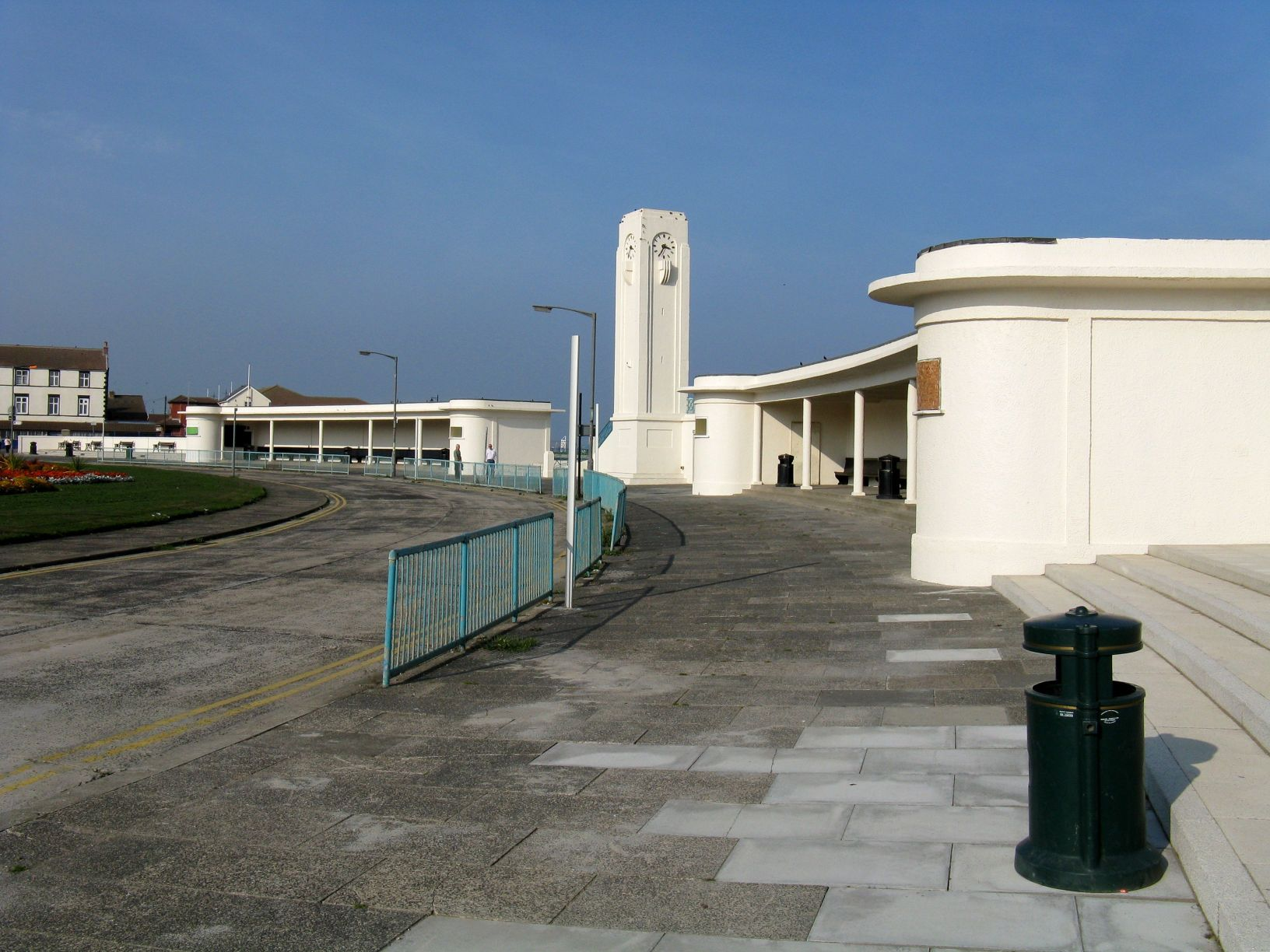
Seaton Carew bus station and Art Deco clock tower

In southern Seaton Carew is the bus station, with a renovated, Grade II listed Art Deco clock tower and shelters. South of this is a beachside car park overlooking Seaton Carew Wreck, the protected remains of a wooden collier vessel on the beach below the tide line. There are numerous other wrecks both in the beach and just off shore. Further south east beyond the village is Seaton Carew Golf Course. The course is sandwiched between the coastal sand dunes and Seaton Common marsh, all known collectively as Seaton Dunes and Common an SSSI. The coastal dunes lead south-east to North Gare breakwater, a concrete pier built between 1882 and 1892 protecting the northern side of the mouth of the Tees. Second World War anti-tank blocks still remain on the beach on the seaward side of the breakwater, and the breakwater itself is fenced off as part of its concrete surface is in a dangerous condition after a partial collapse. Due south of the breakwater is Seaton Snook a promontory into the mouth of the Tees that has lent its name to other areas of land close by. To the west of Seaton Carew is the Durham Coast Railway Line and the Seaton Carew railway station.

== Transport ==
=== Road ===
Seaton Carew is served by the A178 road. Stagecoach Hartlepool provide bus services to Seaton Carew from Throston Grange and Hartlepool Town Centre on service 1 seven days a week. Alternate buses on service 1 extend from Seaton Carew to Middlesbrough and Port Clarence.

=== Rail ===
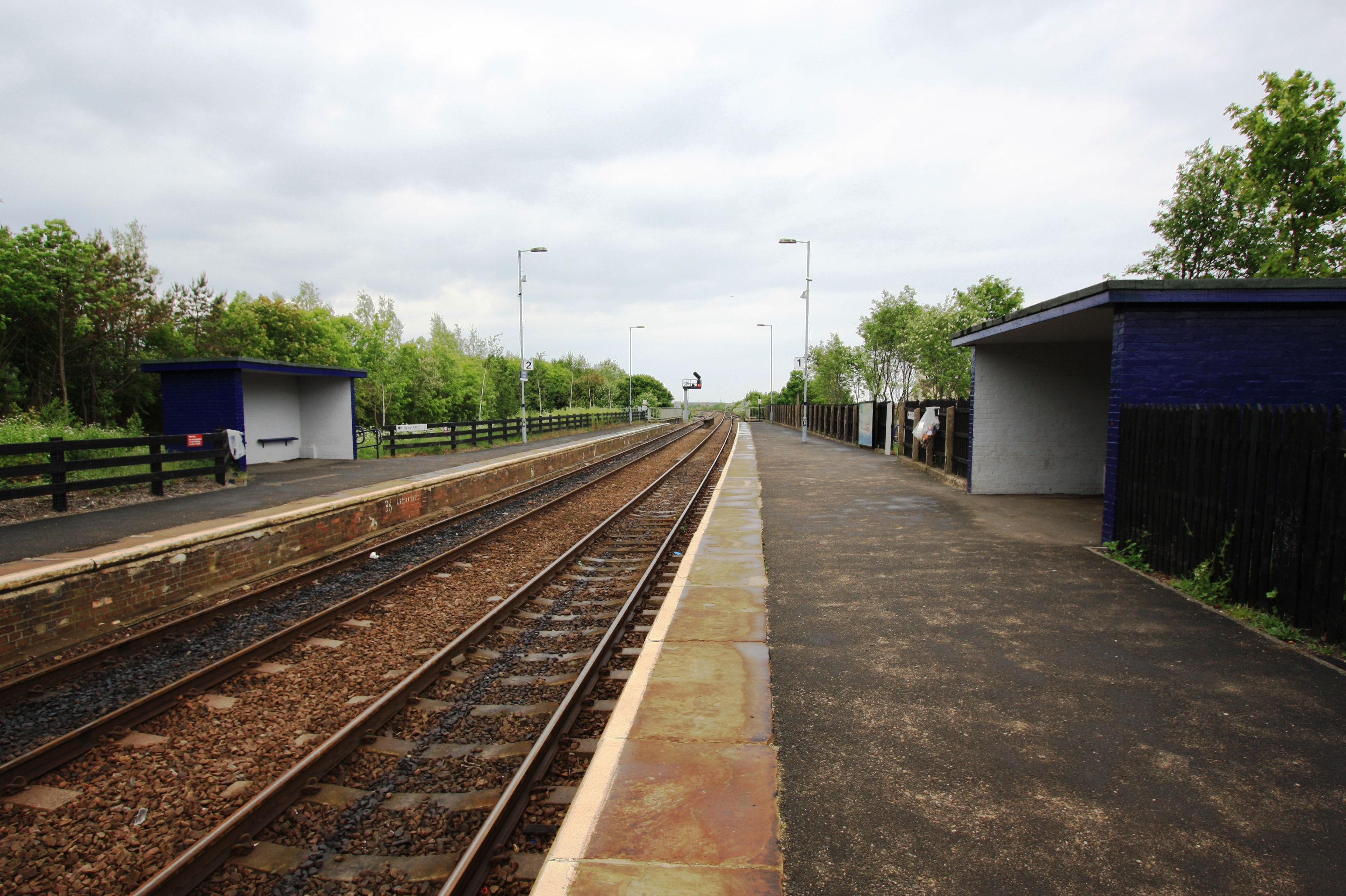
Seaton Carew station

The railway station is also served with hourly Northern services, from Middlesbrough, Sunderland, Newcastle and Hexham.

== Sport ==
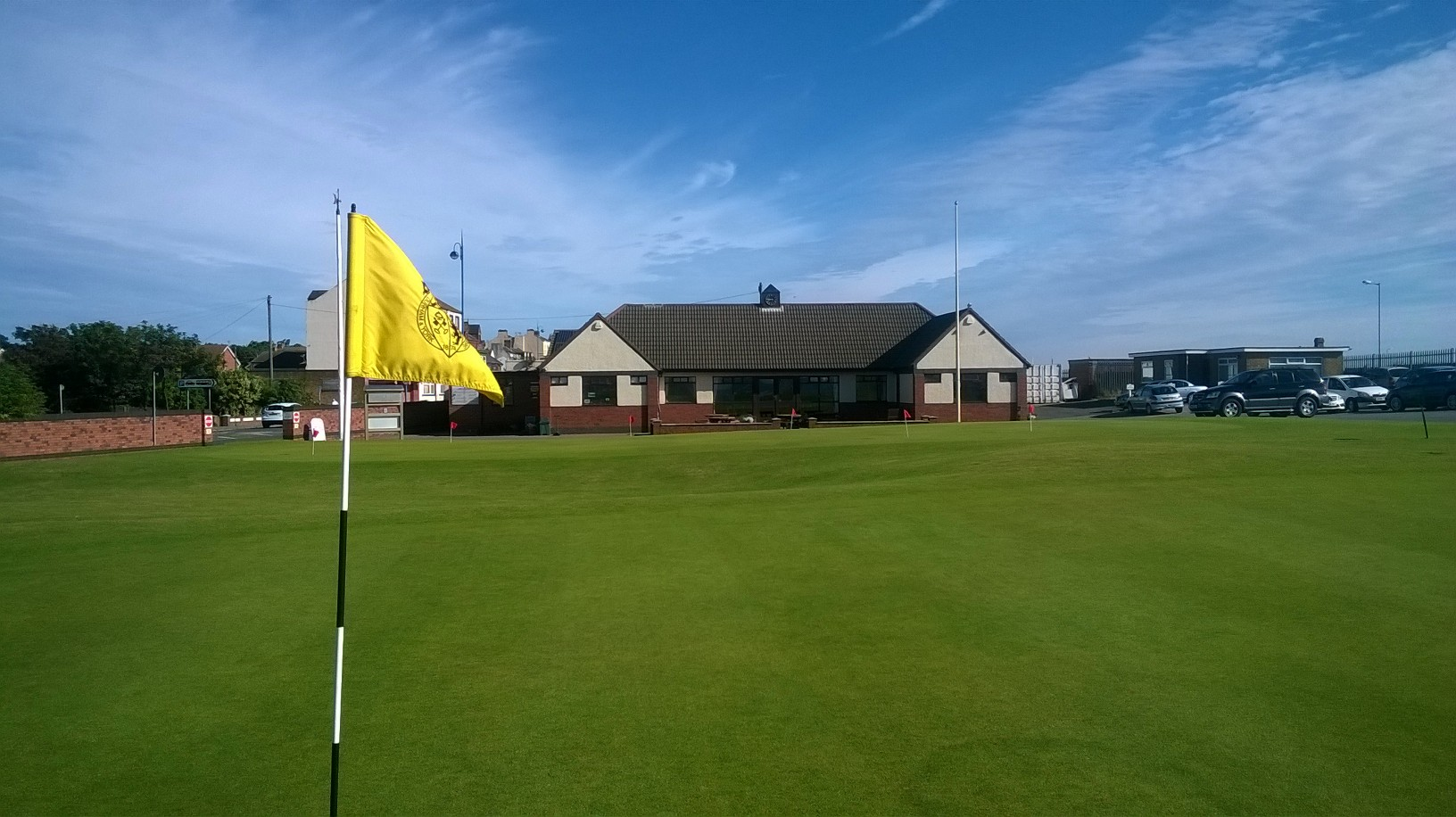
Seaton Carew Golf Club House

Seaton Carew has the following sporting facilities:

- Seaton Carew F.C. was formed in 1998 playing at Hornby Park. The club quickly expanded to accommodate its now 45+ teams who all play at Hornby Park.
- Seaton Carew Golf Club - Golf has been played at Seaton Carew since 1874, making it the tenth-oldest golf club in England. This links course is frequently referred to as one of the most challenging links golf courses in the British Isles and regularly hosts top amateur championships such as the Brabazon Trophy – the English Amateur Championship.
- Seaton Carew Cricket Club was established in 1829 playing at Snooker Field, moving over the road to Hornby Park in February 1973 This is now Seaton Sports and Social Club which supports other various sports including Archery, Rugby (odd balls) and Seaton Carew Football Club, created 1998 with teams from infants to adults. The club is also the meeting ground for: Hartlepool & district Angling Club, slimming world and NHS Marie Curie. The club is a charity run with all profit going to the running maintenance and development of the club and playing fields, to encourage and support sporting and local activities within the community.
- The Sports Domes. Now dismantled in 2024

== Notable people ==
The artist and leading railway poster designer Frank Henry Mason (1875–1965) was born at Seaton Carew and briefly worked in a Hartlepool shipyard.

The science fiction writer Mark Adlard was born in Seaton Carew in 1932 and for a time he lived on The Green.

Neil Warnock, football manager/pundit, lived in Seaton Carew when he played for Hartlepool United.

Footballer Evan Horwood grew up in Seaton before moving to Yorkshire to play for Sheffield United. He has also played for Carlisle United F.C., Hartlepool United and Tranmere Rovers.

John Darwin and his wife Anne lived in Seaton when John faked his death in a canoeing accident in 2002. The story made the news across the world, and it inspired a BBC drama documentary on the Darwins' lives.

== See also ==
- South Shields
- Seaburn
- Seaham
- Saltburn
- Staithes
