= Boulby Quarries =

Historical Site of Special Scientific Interest in England

- Location within North Yorkshire
- Location: Redcar and Cleveland, North Yorkshire, England
- Coordinates: 54°34′12″N 0°50′48″W
- Area: 40.3 ha (100 acres)
- Established: 1989
- Governing body: Natural England
- Website: Map of site

Boulby Quarries (grid reference NZ745200) is a 40.3 hectare geological Site of Special Scientific Interest in Redcar and Cleveland, North Yorkshire, England notified in 1989. It is located close to the coast and the village of Boulby.

In England SSSIs are designated by Natural England and Boulby Quarries is one of 18 SSSIs in the Cleveland area of search. The site is identified as being of national importance in the Geological Conservation Review.

The quarries are wholly within the North Yorkshire and Cleveland Heritage Coast and partly within the North York Moors National Park and the historic North Riding of Yorkshire.

The fossil content of Boulby Quarry is particularly important with two plesiosaur species (Eretmosaurus macroptera and Thaumatosaurus zetlandicus), an ichthyosaur Ichthyosaurus crassimonus and the only Upper Lias pterosaur known in Britain, Parapsicephalus being found at the site. The fossil are found in the bifrons zone, and although not abundant, it is very different from surrounding fossil sites.
