= Hartlepool Submerged Forest =

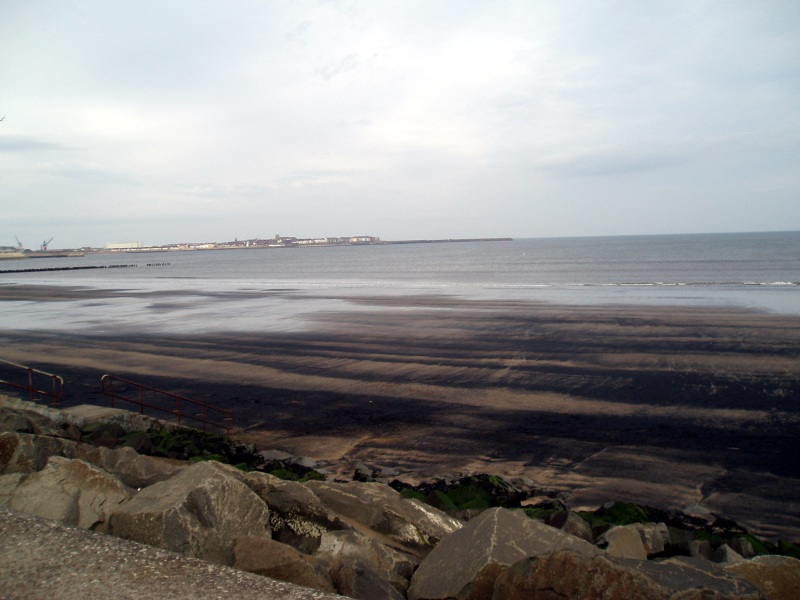
- The site of the submerged forest in 2007

- Location within County Durham
- Location: Hartlepool, County Durham, England
- Coordinates: 54°40′34″N 1°11′34″W
- Area: 19.7 ha (49 acres)
- Established: 1988
- Governing body: Natural England
- Website: Map of site

Hartlepool Submerged Forest (grid reference NZ520315) is a 19.7 hectare geological Site of Special Scientific Interest in County Durham, England notified in 1988. The site is located to the south of Hartlepool Docks.

SSSIs are designated by Natural England, formally English Nature, which uses the 1974–1996 county system. This means there is no grouping of SSSIs by Hartlepool unitary authority, or County Durham which is the relevant ceremonial county . As such Hartlepool Submerged Forest is one of 18 SSSIs in the Cleveland area of search.

A forest stretching for several miles along the Hartlepool coast is thought to have originated around 7,000 years ago. It became submerged as sea levels rose over the next five millennia, but remains preserved to this day as a peaty soil, intermittently revealed on the foreshore by the ebb and flow of the tide. Animal bones, including those of deer and wild boar have been discovered at the site, as well as flint tools and other implements pointing to human activity in the area thousands of years ago. These have been analysed by scientists hoping to understand the environment that existed in the area before the forest was submerged.

The site is also considered to be of significant importance in understanding sea level and environmental changes since the last ice age, and is identified as such in the Geological Conservation Review.

== Land ownership ==
All land within Hartlepool Submerged Forest SSSI is owned by the local authority

== Sources ==
- English Nature citation sheet for the site (accessed 5 August 2006)
