= Teesside Wind Farm =

British offshore wind farm

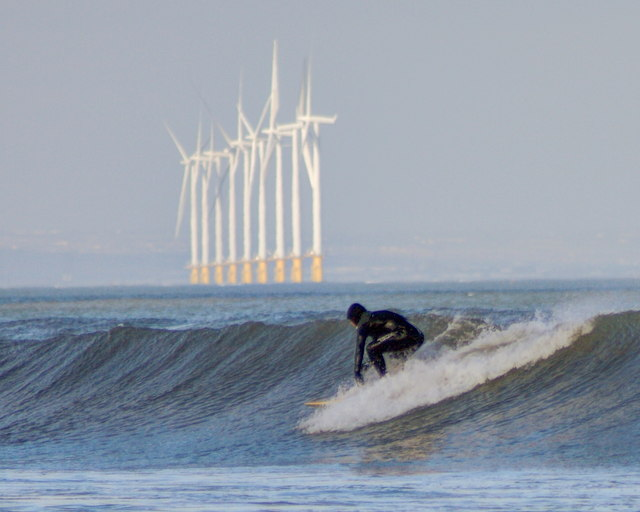
- Country: England
- Location: 1.5km north of Redcar, Teesside
- Coordinates: 54°39′N 1°05′W
- Status: Operation started 2013
- Commission date: 5 July 2013
- Owner: EDF Renewables

Wind farm
- Type: offshore
- Max. water depth: up to 16m.

Power generation
- Make and model: Siemens SWT-2.3–93
- Units planned: 27
- Nameplate capacity: 62.1 MW

External links
- Commons: Related media on Commons

Wind farm layout

Teesside Wind Farm, or alternatively referred to as Redcar Wind Farm, is a 27 turbine 62 MW capacity offshore wind farm constructed just to the east of the mouth of the River Tees and 1.5 km north of Redcar off the North Yorkshire coast, in the North Sea, England.

Construction of the windfarm began in February 2011 and was complete by June 2013. The wind farm was developed by EDF Energy (Northern Offshore Wind) Ltd., and is operated by Teesside Windfarm Ltd.; the owner (100%) is EDF Energy Renewables.

== History and design ==
In 2004 EDF was awarded a 22-year lease from The Crown Estate to develop a wind farm at Teesside during the first phase of UK offshore wind farm development. (See also Round 1 wind farm.) The wind farm site was located 1.5 km offshore of Coatham Sands, Redcar in Cleveland, UK on a 10 km^{2} (3.9 sq mi) site; initial plans were to install 3 rows of 10 turbines of rating 2.3–3.6 MW, with electrical power supplied to shore with landfall at South Gare / Coatham Sands with a land substation and control room at Warrenby; connection to the existing electrical grid was to be made to Northern Electric Distribution (NEDL)'s (see Northern Electric) electricity network at Lackenby

The windfarm was planned to operate at windspeeds between 3.5 to 14 m/s (11 to 46 ft/s) (start to full power), with automatic cut off at wind speeds over 25 m/s (82 ft/s).

The wind farm received planning consent in November 2007; a challenger of the consent decision led to a judicial review, which allowed the project to proceed in 2008; the project was further delayed by difficulty obtaining financing for the project. The offshore substation received planning consent in November 2008. and an agreement on connection to the NEDL grid was reached in November 2009.

Construction of a 27 turbine wind farm using 2.3 MW turbines began in February 2011, with commissioning initially expected for 2012. Turbine foundations were to be up to 5.5m diameter monopiles either drilled and/or piled up to a depth of 35m. Inter turbine electrical connections and the connection to shore were to be energised at 33kV.

The first turbine was installed by January 2013, delayed by half a year from the original expected installation date; by April 2013 17 turbines had been installed with three turbines operational and connected to and supplying power into the UK electricity grid. Installation of the 27 turbines was complete by June 2013. The wind farm was officially opened in April 2014. Its levelised cost has been estimated at £236/MWh, making it the producer of the highest cost electricity of any UK offshore windfarm.

At the end of the 22-year Crown Estate lease, the wind farm is expected to be decommissioned by the developer.

== See also ==
- South Gare & Coatham Sands SSSI
