= Boulby =

Village in North Yorkshire, England

Coordinates: 54.560590°N 0.827000°W

- Hamlet
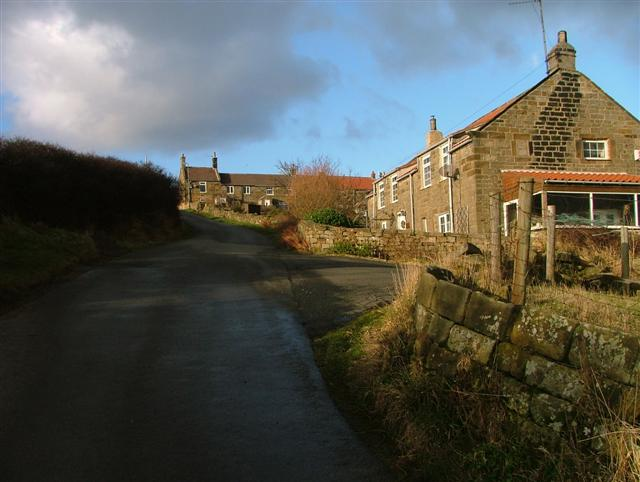
- Boulby Bank

- Location within North Yorkshire
- OS grid reference: NZ759190
- Civil parish: Loftus
- Unitary authority: Redcar and Cleveland
- Ceremonial county: North Yorkshire
- Region: North East
- Country: England
- Sovereign state: United Kingdom
- Post town: SALTBURN-BY-THE-SEA
- Postcode district: TS13
- Police: Cleveland
- Fire: Cleveland
- Ambulance: North East

Boulby (/boʊlbi/) is a hamlet in the Loftus parish, located within the North York Moors National Park. It is in the borough of Redcar and Cleveland, North Yorkshire, England. The hamlet is located off the A174, near Easington and 1-mile (1.6 km) west of Staithes.

It was in the North Riding of Yorkshire until 1974, followed by the county of Cleveland until 1996. The village formerly had alum mining activity and is currently the site of Boulby mine, a 200-hectare (490-acre) site by Cleveland Potash Limited which produces half of the UK's potash output.

== Etymology and history ==
=== Etymology ===
Boulby is an old Scandinavian place name meaning "Bolli's Farm", constructed from the male personal name Bolli + -by, an Old Scandinavian element meaning "farmstead, village or settlement". Examples of Bolli from the 10th century are the Norse Bolli Thorleiksson and his son Bolli Bollason from the Icelandic Sagas, although neither were recorded as coming to England.

The large number of villages and farmsteads containing a personal name and -by are believed to have been settled by Scandinavian conquerors breaking up the English church and secular estates from the late 9th century. There are high density pockets in parts of Yorkshire corresponding to the Norse Kingdom of Jorvik and the subsequent Anglo-Danish Earldom of Northumbria from 954.

=== History ===
In the Domesday Book of 1086, Boulby is given as Bolebi or Bollebi, and appears within the soke of Loftus, held in the William the Conqueror’s time by High d'Avranches, Earl of Chester. It states "In Bolebi, Chiluert had 1 carucate of land, sufficient for 1 plough, valued at 8 shillings." Chiluert held the manor before the conquest. Some time afterwards Boulby, along with Easington, passed to the de Brus family, Lords of Skelton.

The estate of Easington and Boulby came to a branch of the family of Conyers by the mid-15th century, who for several generations, were seated at mansion at Boulby. By the early 19th century the mansion was converted into a farm house, which over the door on a square stone bore the arms of the Conyers. The family were sole proprietors until about 1664, when Nicholas Conyers passed the estate to the sons of his second wife, who all died without male heirs. Nicholas Conyers kept possession of the alum works at Boulby, which was founded in 1615. By 1890 Boulby was described as a "straggling and ruinous village".

In March 2021, archaeologists announced the discovery of an almost 6,000 year-old salt-making complex at a Neolithic site near the Boulby Cliffs. Researchers revealed three salt-making kilns and fragments of dozens of ceramic bowls used in the process. According to Dr Stephen Sherlock, this discovery plays an important role in understanding aspects of the Neolithic agricultural economy. As there is no local source of rock salt, it is probable that the salt was produced by evaporation or sea water.

== Cliffs, quarries and mines ==
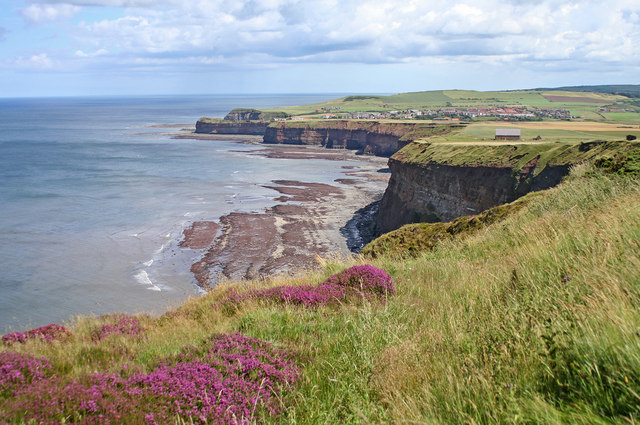
Cliffs and foreshore at Boulby

Just north of the village are some of the highest cliffs in England, at 203 metres (666 ft) above sea level. Boulby Cliff was mined for alum and in A Picturesque History of Yorkshire (1901) the face of the headland is described as being "dotted" with alum-works and miners cottages. This mineral was used as a mordant to improve the strength and permanency of colour when dyeing cloth. This mining was relatively short lived as a cheaper method was developed soon after the boom in alum mining. The ruined remnants of the mines can still be seen from the cliff top when walking the Cleveland Way between Staithes and Skinningrove. To the north-west of the village is Boulby Quarries a Site of Special Scientific Interest designated due to its geological interest.

Boulby is also home to Cleveland Potash at Boulby mine - Europe's second-deepest mine, where potash and rock salt is mined 2 kilometres (1.2 mi) underground. The mine is also the site of the Boulby Underground Laboratory.

Boulby used to be served by the Whitby Redcar and Middlesbrough Union Railway (WRMU) which ran along the coastline to Whitby Town station where it met the Scarborough & Whitby Railway. However the WRMU was closed in 1958. Today the railway line from Saltburn has been reopened for goods as far as the mine, and is used for the transportation of potash and rock salt.
