= Seal Sands Power Station =

Power station in County Durham, England

- Official name: Seal Sands Power Station
- Country: England
- Location: Tees Valley (formally Cleveland), North East England
- Coordinates: 54.606739°N 1.202678°W
- Commission date: 1997
- Owner: Rockland Capital
- Operators: Viking Power (1997-2004); PX Ltd (2004-present)

Thermal power station
- Primary fuel: Natural gas

Power generation
- Nameplate capacity: 50 MW

Seal Sands Power Station (also known as Viking Power Station) is a gas-fired gas turbine power station situated on the River Tees at Seal Sands near Billingham, in the borough of Stockton-on-Tees, which is part of County Durham, North East England.

== Operations ==
Construction of the plant began in 1997, it was built as a collaboration between National Power and Kværner Construction, costing £25 million to construct. When it opened in the spring of 1999, it used the first Rolls-Royce Trent engine to be put into industrial service. The station uses a single 50 megawatt gas turbine, which is fueled by natural gas. Northern Electric originally supplied the gas for the station, as well as distributing the electricity generated. The plant has a 40% efficiency at 15 °C. As of September 2004, PX Limited have maintained the station, while Viking Power own the station.
