= Cowpen Marsh =

Protected area in County Durham, England

- Location within County Durham
- Location: Stockton-on-Tees, North East, England
- Coordinates: 54°37′18″N 1°13′29″W
- Area: 116.8 ha (289 acres)
- Established: 1966
- Governing body: Natural England
- Website: Map of site

Cowpen Marsh (grid reference NZ500529) is a 116.8 hectare biological Site of Special Scientific Interest in County Durham, England, notified in 1966. SSSIs are designated by Natural England, formally English Nature, which uses the 1974–1996 county system. This means there is no grouping of SSSIs by Stockton-on-Tees unitary authority, or County Durham which is the relevant ceremonial county . As such Cowpen Marsh is one of 18 SSSIs in the Cleveland area of search.

== Sources ==
- "English Nature citation sheet for the site" (PDF).
