= Tees Transporter Bridge =

Bridge over the River Tees, England

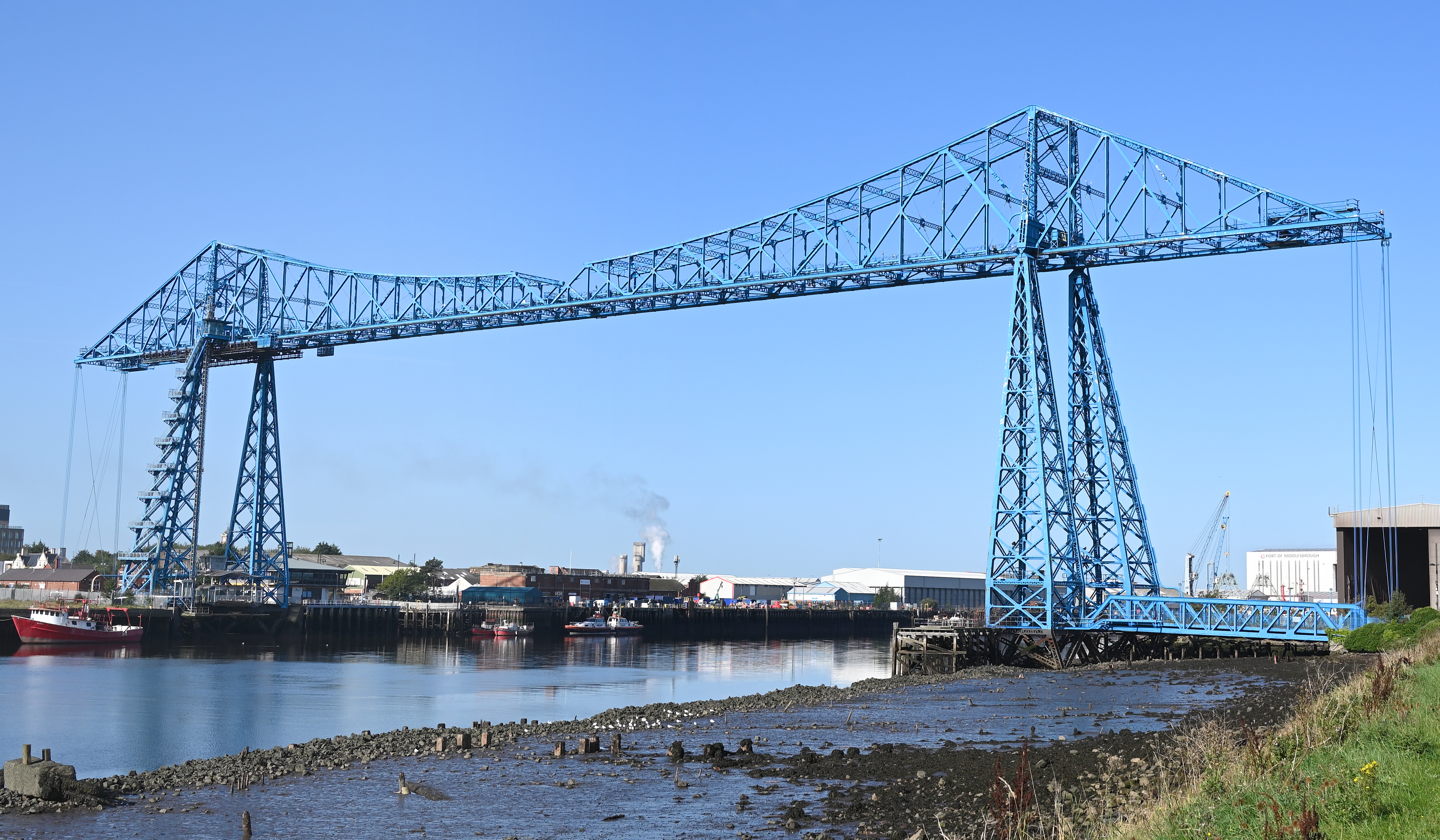
- The bridge seen from the north bank
- Coordinates: 54.5845°N 1.2279°W
- Carries: Motor vehicles A178 road Pedestrians
- Crosses: River Tees
- Locale: Middlesbrough and Port Clarence, England
- Official name: Tees Transporter Bridge
- Owner: Stockton-on-Tees Borough Council and Middlesbrough Council
- Maintained by: Middlesbrough Council
- Website: www.middlesbrough.gov.uk/parking-roads-and-footpaths/tees-transporter-bridge
- Preceded by: Tees Newport Bridge
- Followed by: North Sea

Characteristics
- Design: Transporter bridge
- Material: Steel, concrete
- Total length: 850 ft (260 m)
- Longest span: 570 ft (170 m)
- Clearance below: 160 ft (49 m)

History
- Designer: Cleveland Bridge and Engineering Company
- Contracted lead designer: CG Imbault
- Constructed by: Sir William Arrol & Co.
- Opened: 17 October 1911

Statistics
- Toll: Vehicles (<3 tons): £1.50 (1 bay); Pedestrians and Cyclists: 70p

Listed Building – Grade II*
- Official name: Transporter Bridge
- Designated: 21 June 1985
- Reference no.: 1139267

Location
- Interactive map of Tees Transporter Bridge

The Tees Transporter Bridge, also referred to as the Middlesbrough Transporter Bridge or, locally, as The Transporter, is a bridge over the River Tees in northern England. The northern side is in Port Clarence (Stockton-on-Tees) and the southern side is in Middlesbrough. It is grade II* listed and the longest existing transporter in the world. Its winch house and piers are grade II listed.

It is the furthest downstream bridge crossing over the river. It is classed as the A178 road, the road between Middlesbrough and Hartlepool. The bridge carries a travelling 'car,' or 'gondola,' suspended below the fixed structure, across the river in 90 seconds. The gondola can carry 200 people, nine cars, or six cars and one minibus.

The bridge has not been operational since 2019 due to safety concerns. A refurbishment scheme is currently being developed, with works on site expected to start in 2027 and completed by 2032, subject to funding.

== History ==
=== Proposal and construction (1872–1911) ===
Middlesbrough Corporation (Transporter Bridge) Act 1907
- Act of Parliament
- Parliament of the United Kingdom
- Long title: An Act to authorise the mayor aldermen and burgesses of the county borough of Middlesbrough to construct a transporter bridge across the River Tees and to discontinue the Middlesbrough and Port Clarence Ferry and for other purposes.
- Citation: 7 Edw. 7. c. xx

Dates
- Royal assent: 4 July 1907
Other legislation
Repealed by	Middlesbrough Corporation Act 1933

Status: Repealed

The idea of a transporter bridge across the River Tees was first mooted in 1872 when Charles Smith, manager of the Hartlepool Iron Works, submitted a scheme to Middlesbrough Corporation. However, the scheme was not pursued, and it would not be until the new century that the idea of a transporter bridge across the river would again be revisited. Following a 1907 act of Parliament (UK), the Middlesbrough Corporation (Transporter Bridge) Act 1907 (7 Edw. 7. c. xx), the bridge was built at a cost of £68,026 6s 8d (equivalent to £7,080,000 in 2025 values), by Sir William Arrol & Co. of Glasgow between 1910 and 1911 to replace the 'Hugh Bell' and 'Erimus' steam ferry services. A transporter bridge was chosen because Parliament ruled that the new scheme of crossing the river had to avoid affecting the river navigation.

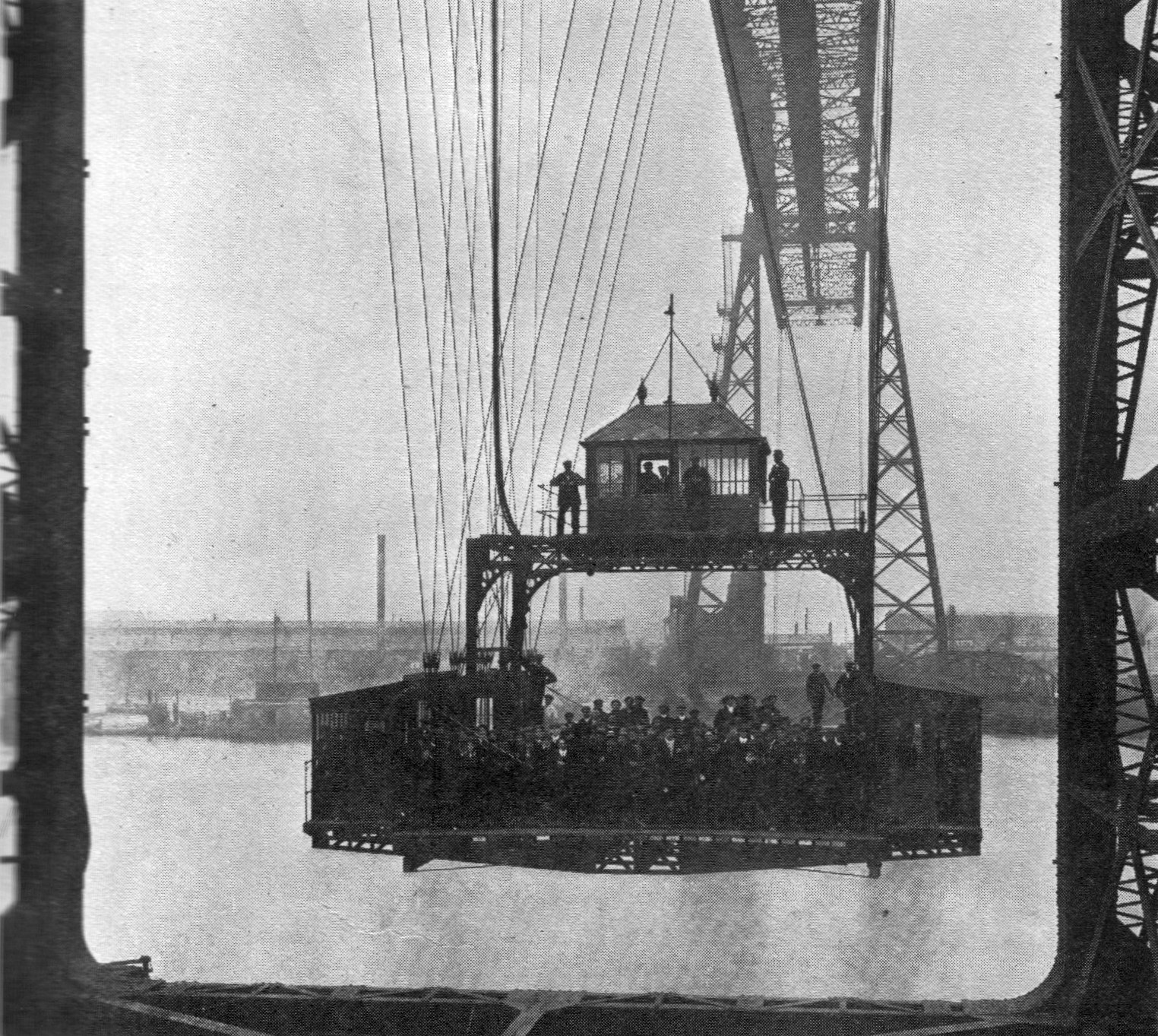
The gondola c. 1911

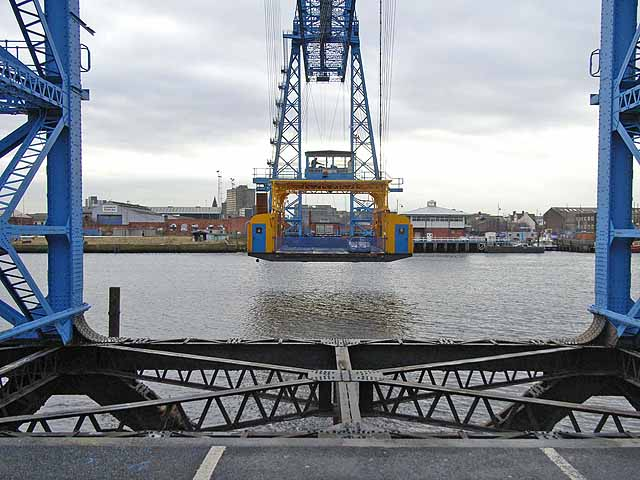
The gondola c. 2008

Construction work started in July 1909 with caissons being used to allow workers to dig down to bedrock. This turned out to be 65 feet (20 m) below the high tide mark on the Middlesbrough side and 90 feet (27 m) on the other. The shafts that had been dug out by this process were then filled with concrete. The formal laying of the foundation stones, made of Aberdeen granite, took place in August 1910 when they were laid by the Mayor of Middlesbrough, Thomas Gibson-Poole, and Alderman Joseph McLauchlan, the initiator of the transporter bridge scheme. The opening ceremony on 17 October 1911 was performed by Prince Arthur of Connaught. At its opening the bridge was painted red.

=== Open (1911–2019) ===
During the First World War, Middlesbrough was bombed by the Zeppelin L 11 in April 1916. During this raid it was reported that a bomb fell through the structure before hitting the river below. During the Second World War, the superstructure of the bridge was hit by a bomb. In 1953, the gondola got stuck halfway. While it was stuck, gale force winds lashed water to within inches of it; despite this, the bridge continued to operate.

In 1961, the bridge was painted blue.

In 1974, the comedy actor Terry Scott, travelling between his hotel in Middlesbrough and a performance at the Billingham Forum, mistook the bridge for a regular toll crossing and drove his Jaguar off the end of the roadway, landing in the safety netting beneath.

In December 1993, the bridge was awarded the Institution of Mechanical Engineers' highest honour, the Heritage Plaque, for engineering excellence, in recognition of the council's efforts in keeping the bridge in good working order. Its historical importance was also recognised in 1985 by its listing as a Grade II* Listed Building, and its prominence as a local landmark was further enhanced in 1993 by the installation of floodlights that operate during the winter months.

In July 2000, a visitor centre was opened on land previously occupied by the bridge workshop.

In 2011, the Tees Transporter Bridge received a £2.6 million Heritage Lottery Fund award for improvement and renovation work to mark the bridge's centenary. The improvement works included the installation of a glass viewing lift to the landmark's upper walkway and renovation of the gondola.

The bridge was closed on 27 August 2013 for 40 days of repainting. It was then discovered that repairs were needed. In the same year, the Tees Transporter Bridge Anniversary Award was inaugurated as part of the Transporter Bridge's Heritage Lottery Fund-supported Visitor Experience Project in partnership with the Chartered Institution of Highways and Transportation (CIHT) and Teesside University. The inaugural award winner was Stephen Brown in autumn 2013, with Jason Dunnett receiving the accolade in autumn 2014.

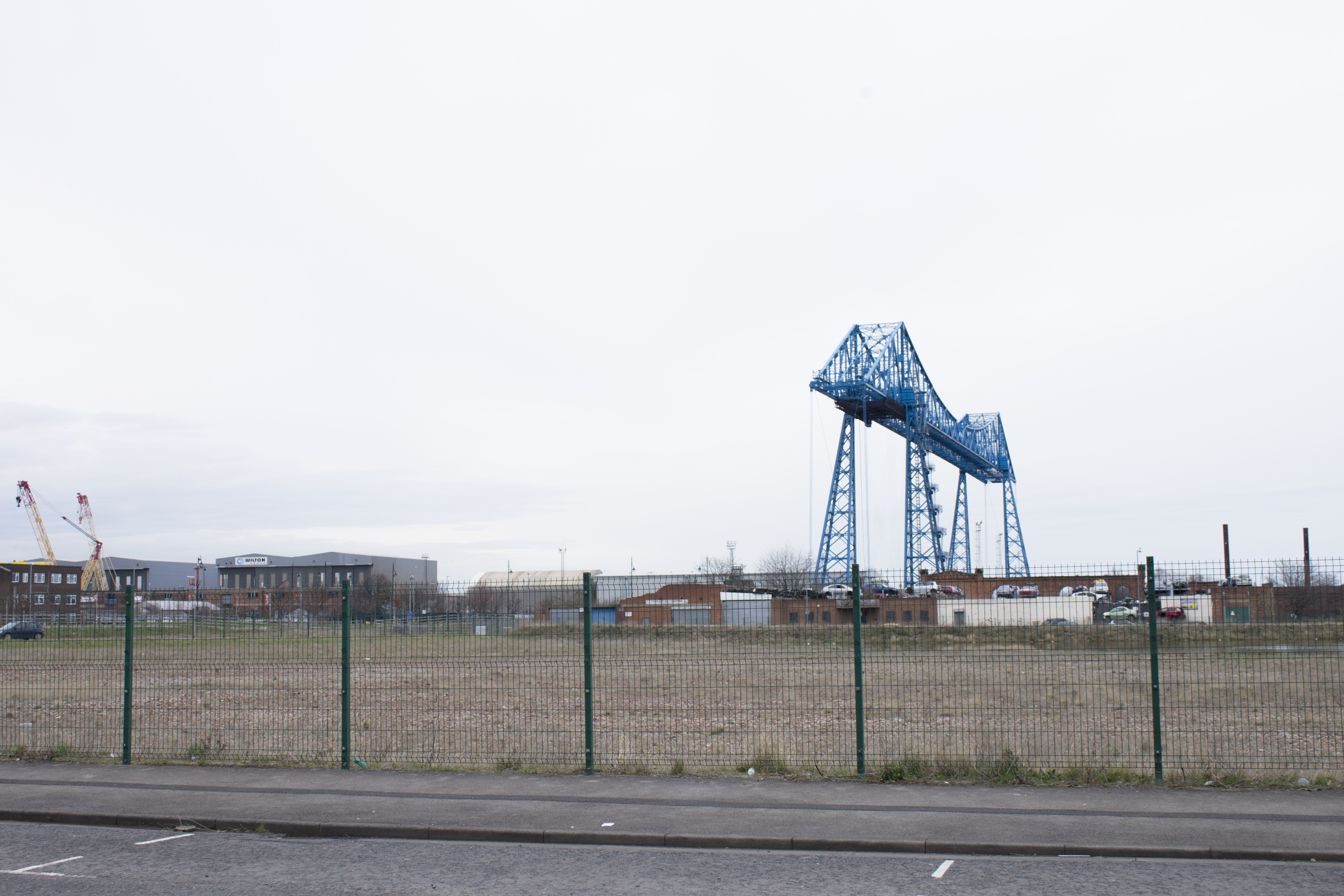
Transporter Bridge, April 2018

On 5 March 2015, the Royal Mail issued a set of 10 First Class commemorative postage stamps featuring iconic British bridges including the Tees Transporter Bridge. The bridge was re-opened for traffic on 6 April 2015, but improvement work continued with the bridge still in daily use. These were completed in September 2015 after more than £4 million had been spent on the structure.

=== Closure and proposed refurbishment (2019–present) ===
In August 2019, the bridge was temporarily closed due to safety concerns.

In 2020, a principal detailed inspection was commissioned by the council, with specialist engineering companies using rope-access techniques. Areas of concern led to a structural assessment, carried out in 2023 and 2024 by engineering and consulting firm AtkinsRéalis. The report categorised the bridge as "an immediate risk structure."

Since then, more than 100 sensors have continuously tracked the bridge's movement, tilt angles, temperature, pressure, wind speed and direction, and tidal conditions at key points.

Around £1.77m has been spent on emergency works, surveys, assessments and the installation of digital monitoring since its closure. The costs have been shared between Middlesbrough Council, which takes the lead on managing the bridge, and Stockton Borough Council. A report in 2024 suggested repairs could cost £67m.

A preliminary design for the refurbishment, undertaken by AtkinsRéalis, is to be completed in summer 2026. With works on site expected to begin in 2027, subject to funding, with repairs focusing on strengthening the towers, replacing back stay cables and other steelworks repairs. The new assessment of the cost is £60m and this is "beyond the means" of the two local councils with responsibility for the repairs, according to the Victorian Society, who in April 2026 added the bridge to their annual top 10 endangered buildings list for England and Wales. It is hoped the work would be done by 2032, 13 years after it closed to the public. In November 2026, contractor BAM was appointed to spend 12 months working with AtkinsRéalis on detailed testing and trials before drawing up refurbishment proposals and cost estimates.

== Local culture ==
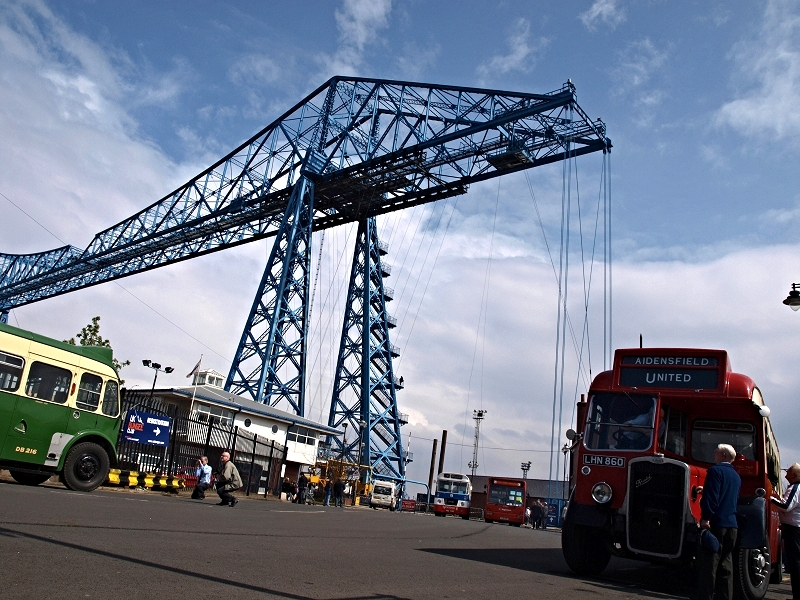
2010 Teesside Running Day

Locally, the bridge is often referred to simply as 'the Transporter'.

The bridge hosts an annual vintage bus running day, usually a Sunday in April. Organised by The 500 Group, vintage buses take people on free rides around Teesside. As part of the 2006 and 2007 events, the bridge made a special trip carrying a former Teesside Municipal Transport Daimler Fleetline, the first time a double-decker bus had used the bridge in 30 years.

It has been featured in films and TV programmes including Boys from the Blackstuff, Billy Elliot, The Fast Show, Spender, Vera, and Steel River Blues. During the millennium celebrations of 2000, fireworks were fired from its length. The storyline of the third series of Auf Wiedersehen, Pet saw the bridge dismantled to be sold to and re-erected in the United States. The local council received calls from people worried that the bridge was really being pulled down, with the BBC adding a disclaimer on the end of the final episode of the series stating that 'The Transporter Bridge is still in Middlesbrough'.

== See also ==
- Newport Transporter Bridge – a similar bridge in South East Wales;
- Warrington Transporter Bridge – a similar bridge in North West England, now disused.

Next crossing upstream	Tees	Next crossing downstream
Tees Newport Bridge	Tees Transporter Bridge; Grid reference NZ4999121297	none
