= Mark Adlard =

English novelist

- Born: Peter Marcus Adlard; 19 June 1932 (age 94); Seaton Carew, County Durham, England
- Occupation: Author
- Writing career
- Genres: Social science fiction Historical fiction
- Notable works: Interface; Volteface; Multiface

Peter Marcus "Mark" Adlard (born 19 June 1932) is an English novelist.

Born in Seaton Carew, he is the son of Arthur Marcus Adlard, an auctioneer, and Ethel Leech. Adlard was educated at the University of London, Trinity College, Cambridge, and the Department of Education at Oxford. Aside from writing, his career has consisted mainly of management jobs in the steel industry.

Adlard's best-known works are the social science fiction novels Interface, Volteface, and Multiface. published during the early 1970s. The novels concern Tcity, a 22nd-century domed megacity covering the entirety of the English North Eastern industrial area between the River Tyne and the River Tees.

A later novel, The Greenlander (1978) concerns the whaling industry in Northeast England during the early years of steam-powered shipping. This was intended to be the first of a series but, to date, no further volumes have been published.
