= Seaton Dunes and Common =

Protected area in Hartlepool, England

- Location within County Durham
- Location: Hartlepool, County Durham, England
- Coordinates: 54°38′57″N 1°10′12″W
- Area: 312.1 ha (771 acres)
- Established: 1966
- Governing body: Natural England
- Website: Map of site

Seaton Dunes and Common (grid reference NZ535285) is a 312.1 hectare biological Site of Special Scientific Interest in Hartlepool, County Durham, England notified in 1966. Part of it is a Local Nature Reserve.

SSSIs are designated by Natural England, formally English Nature, which uses the 1974–1996 county system. This means there is no grouping of SSSIs by Hartlepool unitary authority, or County Durham which is the relevant ceremonial county . As such Seaton Dunes and Common is one of 18 SSSIs in the Cleveland area of search.
