= South Gare & Coatham Sands SSSI =

Site of scientific interest in Yorkshire, England

South Gare & Coatham Sands
- Location within North Yorkshire
- Location: Redcar and Cleveland, North Yorkshire, England
- Coordinates: 54°37′44″N 1°5′51″W
- Area: 381.2 ha (942 acres)
- Established: 1971
- Governing body: Natural England
- Website: Map of site

South Gare & Coatham Sands SSSI (grid reference NZ582263) is a 381.2 hectare biological Site of Special Scientific Interest in North Yorkshire, England notified in 1971.

SSSIs are designated by Natural England, formally English Nature, which uses the 1974–1996 county system. This means there is no grouping of SSSIs by Redcar and Cleveland unitary authority, or North Yorkshire which is the relevant ceremonial county. As such South Gare & Coatham Sands is one of 18 SSSIs in the Cleveland area of search.

== See also ==
South Gare

== Sources ==
- English Nature citation sheet for the site (accessed 6 August 2006)
