= A178 road =

Road in North Yorkshire, England

Coordinates: 54.63263°N 1.20525°W

A178

Route information
- Length: 9.5 mi (15.3 km)

Major junctions
- North end: Hartlepool
- A179 A689 A1185 A1046; A66
- South end: Middlesbrough

Location
- Country: United Kingdom
- Constituent country: England

Road network
- Roads in the United Kingdom; Motorways; A and B road zones

The A178 is a road that runs from Hartlepool in County Durham to Middlesbrough in North Yorkshire, England.

== Route ==
The route of the A178 starts at the junction of the A179 and A689 in Hartlepool. It runs east as Church Street passing Hartlepool railway station. At the end of Church Street, it turns right and runs south as Mainsforth Terrace until it passes the bridge over the Durham Coast Line then runs as Coronation Drive passing along the Hartlepool to Seaton Carew promenade. It passes through Seaton Carew as The Cliff and The Front then as Tees Road passing the B1277 Brenda Road roundabout and Hartlepool Power Station. The road passes through Graythorp and Seal Sands and then passes the bridge over Greatham Creek, where there is a nature watching viewpoint close to the road.

It passes the A1185 roundabout and the Saltholme nature reserve as Seaton Carew Road. It turns left at the A1046 junction in Port Clarence as Port Clarence Road then turns left as Ferry Road over the River Tees on the Middlesbrough Transporter Bridge. It passes through St. Hilda's and runs south as Durham Street and then runs as Cleveland Street. At the end of Cleveland Street, it turns right and runs as Bridge Street West passing Middlesbrough railway station and then runs as North Road. It passes the bridge over the Tees Valley Line and ends at the junction of the A66 and the B1272 in Middlesbrough.

The Middlesbrough Transporter Bridge may be closed at times and as an alternative route drivers should turn right on the A1046 through Port Clarence and Haverton Hill then turn left on the A1032 over the River Tees on the Tees Newport Bridge.
