= English Nature =

Former UK government conservation agency

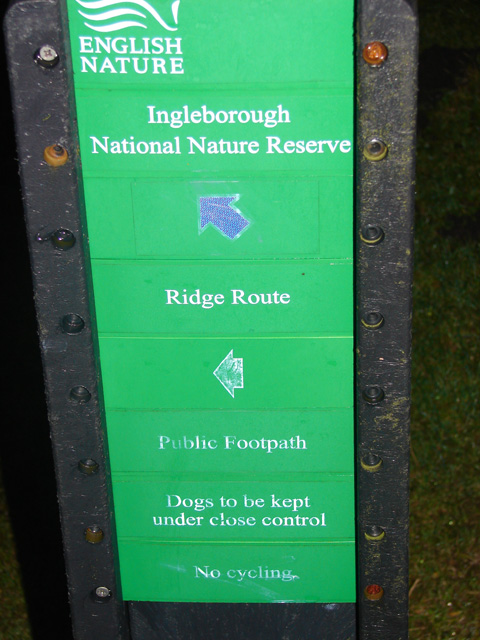
English Nature - Ingleborough National Nature Reserve

English Nature was the United Kingdom government agency that promoted the conservation of wildlife, geology and wild places throughout England between 1990 and 2006. It was a non-departmental public body funded by the Department for Environment, Food and Rural Affairs (DEFRA) and gave statutory advice, grants and issued licences.

The Nature Conservancy Council (NCC) (formerly the Nature Conservancy) was established by the National Parks and Access to the Countryside Act 1949 to cover nature conservation issues across the whole of Great Britain. The NCC was split into four by the Environmental Protection Act 1990—its English duties being given to English Nature. In Scotland, its functions were merged with those of the Countryside Commission for Scotland to form Scottish Natural Heritage, and similarly in Wales there was a merger to form the Countryside Council for Wales. A much smaller body, the Joint Nature Conservation Committee (JNCC), supported all three agencies. The English functions of the Countryside Commission went to the newly formed Countryside Agency.

English Nature worked closely with the JNCC and the equivalent bodies for Scotland, Wales, and Northern Ireland (the Northern Ireland Environment Agency) to bring a consistent approach to nature conservation throughout the United Kingdom and towards fulfilling its international obligations.

The agency ceased to exist in October 2006 following a review by Lord Haskins, enacted in the Natural Environment and Rural Communities Act 2006. It was integrated with parts of both the Rural Development Service and the Countryside Agency from 1 October 2006, to form a new body called Natural England.
