= Site of Special Scientific Interest =

Protected area in the United Kingdom

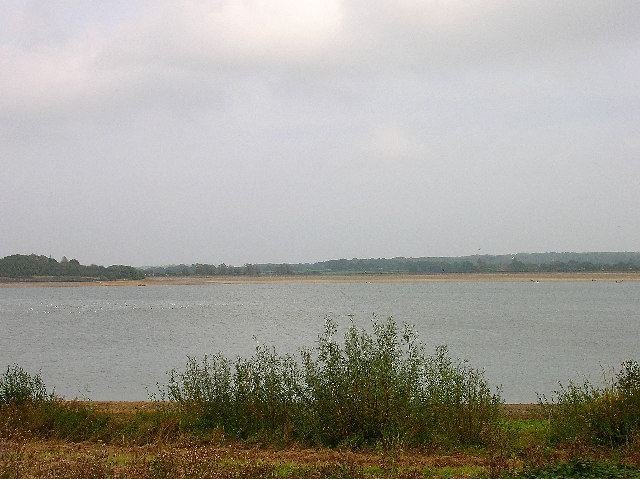
Arlington Reservoir, a 99.4-hectare (246-acre) biological SSSI in Arlington, East Sussex

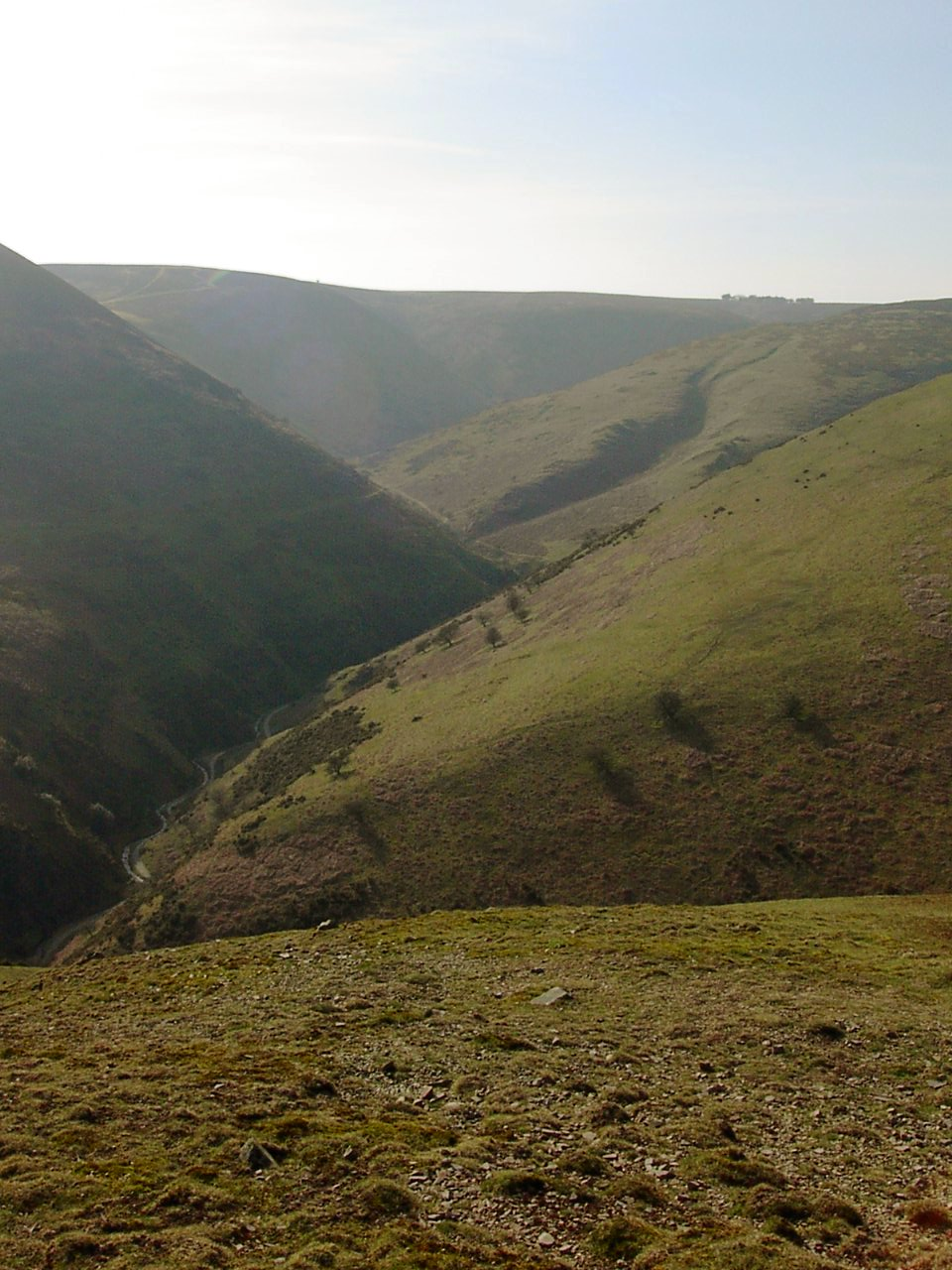
Long Mynd, view up Ashes Hollow towards Pole Bank

A Site of Special Scientific Interest (SSSI) in Great Britain, or an Area of Special Scientific Interest (ASSI) in the Isle of Man and Northern Ireland, is a conservation designation denoting a protected area in the United Kingdom and Isle of Man. SSSI/ASSIs are the basic building block of site-based nature conservation legislation and most other legal nature/geological conservation designations in the United Kingdom are based upon them, including national nature reserves, Ramsar sites, Special Protection Areas, and Special Areas of Conservation. The abbreviation SSSI is often pronounced "triple-S I".

== Selection and conservation ==
Sites notified for their biological interest are known as Biological SSSIs (or ASSIs), and those notified for geological or physiographic interest are Geological SSSIs (or ASSIs). Sites may be divided into management units, with some areas including units that are noted for both biological and geological interest.

=== Biological ===
Biological SSSI/ASSIs may be selected for various reasons, which for Great Britain is governed by published SSSI Selection Guidelines. Within each area, a representative series of the best examples of each significant natural habitat may be notified, and for rarer habitats all examples may be included. Sites of particular significance for various taxonomic groups may be selected (for example birds, dragonflies, butterflies, reptiles, amphibians, etc.)—each of these groups has its own set of selection guidelines.

Conservation of biological SSSI/ASSIs usually involves continuation of the natural and artificial processes which resulted in their development and survival, for example the continued traditional grazing of heathland or chalk grassland.

In England the designating body for SSSIs, Natural England, selects biological SSSIs from within natural areas which are areas with particular landscape and ecological characteristics, or on a county basis. In Scotland the designating authority is NatureScot; the role in Wales is performed by Natural Resources Wales (formerly the Countryside Council for Wales). In the Isle of Man the role is performed by the Department of Environment, Food and Agriculture.

=== Geological ===
Geological SSSI/ASSIs are selected by a different mechanism to biological ones, with a minimalistic system selecting one site for each geological feature in Great Britain. Academic geological specialists have reviewed geological literature, selecting sites within Great Britain of at least national importance for each of the most important features within each geological topic (or block). Each of these sites is described, with most published in the Geological Conservation Review series, and so becomes a GCR site. Almost all GCR sites (but no other sites) are subsequently notified as geological SSSIs, except some that coincide with designated biological SSSI management units. A GCR site may contain features from several different topic blocks, for example a site may contain strata containing vertebrate fossils, insect fossils and plant fossils and it may also be of importance for stratigraphy.

Geological sites fall into two categories with different conservation priorities: exposure sites and deposit sites. Exposure sites are where quarries, disused railway cuttings, cliffs or outcrops give access to extensive geological features, such as particular rock layers. If the exposure becomes obscured, the feature could in principle be re-exposed elsewhere. Conservation of these sites usually concentrates on maintenance of access for future study. Deposit sites are features which are limited in extent or physically delicate—for example, they include small lenses of sediment, mine tailings, caves and other landforms. If such features become damaged they cannot be recreated and conservation usually involves protecting the feature from erosion or other damage.

== Legal status ==
Following devolution, legal arrangements for SSSIs (Scotland, England, Wales) and ASSIs (Northern Ireland) differ between the countries of the UK. The Isle of Man ASSI system is a separate entity.

NatureScot publishes a summary of the SSSI arrangements for SSSI owners and occupiers (other than public bodies) which can be downloaded from its website. Legal documents for all SSSIs in Scotland are available on the SSSI Register, hosted by The Registers of Scotland. Further information about SSSIs in Scotland is available on the NatureScot website.

The decision to notify an SSSI is made by the relevant nature conservation body (the appropriate conservation body) for that part of the United Kingdom: Northern Ireland Environment Agency, Natural England, NatureScot or Natural Resources Wales. SSSIs were originally set up by the National Parks and Access to the Countryside Act 1949, but the current legal framework for SSSIs is provided in England and Wales by the Wildlife and Countryside Act 1981, amended in 1985 and further substantially amended in 2000 (by the Countryside and Rights of Way Act 2000), in Scotland by the Nature Conservation (Scotland) Act 2004 and in Northern Ireland by the Nature Conservation and Amenity Lands (Northern Ireland) Order 1985. SSSIs are also covered under the Water Resources Act 1991 and related legislation.

An SSSI may be made on any area of land which is considered to be of special interest by virtue of its fauna, flora, geological or physiographical / geomorphological features.

SSSI notification can cover any "land" within the area of the relevant nature conservation body, including dry land, land covered by fresh water. The extent to which an SSSI/ASSI may extend seawards differs between countries. In Scotland an SSSI may include the intertidal land down to mean low water spring or to the extent of the local planning authority area, thus only limited areas of estuaries and coastal waters beyond MLWS may be included. In England, Natural England may notify an SSSI over estuarial waters and further adjacent waters in certain circumstances (section 28(1A & 1B) of the Wildlife and Countryside Act 1981 as amended by Part 2 of Annex 13 of the Marine and Coastal Access Act 2010).

Access to SSSIs is the same as for the rest of the countryside of the relevant country. Most SSSIs/ASSIs are in private ownership and form parts of working farms, forests and estates. In Scotland, people may use their rights of responsible access to visit SSSIs.

When designating an SSSI/ASSI, the relevant nature conservation body must formally notify the interested parties and allow a period for them to make representations before confirming the notification. When creating a new SSSI/ASSI the designation has legal effect from the date of notification. The interested parties include central government, local planning authorities, national park authorities, all the owners and occupiers of the land, relevant public bodies such as the utility providers e.g., water companies. In Scotland, NatureScot must also notify the relevant community councils and community group having registered an interest in the land.

The notification includes a description of the land and the natural features for which it is notified ("the citation"), a boundary map, and a list of the acts or omissions (activities) that the nature conservation body regulates through the issue of consents.

The various laws protect the interest features of SSSIs from development, from other damage, and (since 2000 in England) also from neglect. Protection is not necessarily absolute—generally it requires the SSSI interest to be considered properly against other factors.

Local planning authorities are required to have policies in their development plans which protect SSSIs. They are then required to consult the appropriate conservation body over planning applications which might affect the interest of an SSSI (such a development might not be within or even close to the SSSI itself). The effect of this is to prevent development which harms the interest – except where the value of that interest is over-ridden by some more important factor, for example a requirement for a major road or port or oil pipe. The requirement for consultation covers any development which might affect the interest, not just developments within the SSSI itself – for example, a development a long way upstream of a wetland SSSI might require consultation. Some developments might be neutral or beneficial, even if they are within the SSSI itself – the critical point is whether they harm the interest features.

The owners and occupiers of SSSIs are required (Scotland, England, Wales) to obtain consent from the relevant nature conservation body if they want to carry out, cause or permit to be carried out within the SSSI any of the activities listed in the notification. Formerly these activities were called 'potentially damaging operations' or PDOs. Under the current legal arrangements they are called 'operations requiring consent' or ORCs (Scotland), or 'operations likely to damage the SSSI interest' or OLDs (England & Wales). The list of ORCs/OLDs for each SSSI is unique to that site – though all are derived from a standard list for that country. The ORCs/OLDs are not "banned" activities – the list includes activities which would damage the interest, but also many which might be beneficial. For example, "grazing" (a standard item on the list) would require consent, even on a chalk grassland or heathland where grazing is an essential part of management.

In England and Wales the list of OLDs is almost the same for each SSSI – and the list for an SSSI will only omit activities impossible on the particular SSSI (such as fishing where there is no water), and things requiring planning permission (which are covered by the local planning authority consultation process). In Scotland, and following the implementation of the Nature Conservation (Scotland) Act 2004, Scottish Natural Heritage (the former name for NatureScot) reviewed the ORC lists for each SSSI and removed those activities that were unlikely to happen and if they were to would be unlikely to damage the protected natural features, and other activities adequately regulated by other statutory regimes. The intention of this was to remove the need for owners and occupiers to obtain SSSI consent as well as licences/ permits from other authorities (who must consult NatureScot prior to determining such applications). Purely geological SSSIs often have much shorter OLD lists.

If a proposed activity would not affect the interest or is beneficial to it, then the conservation body will issue a "consent" allowing it to be carried out without further consultation. If it would be harmful, the conservation body may issue consent subject to conditions or refuse the application. If consent in writing is not given the operation must not proceed. Conditions may cover any relevant aspect of the proposed operation and may, for example, limit its timing, location or intensity. The process is slightly different where the owner or occupier is a public body, but the effect is broadly similar.

The relevant nature conservation body sends all SSSI owners and occupiers a site-specific 'site management statement' describing the ideal management (there may be grants available to help fund management). Owners and occupiers are encouraged to carry out this management, which in many (but not all) cases will be a continuation of the historical management of the land. Where an owner or occupier is unwilling or unable to carry out management, ultimately the conservation body can require it to be done. Public bodies which own or occupy an SSSI have a duty to manage it properly. Site management statements for SSSI in Scotland are available to download from the NatureScot website using the "Sitelink" facility.

The law protecting SSSIs now covers everyone, not just public bodies and the owners and occupiers of SSSIs. Previously, activities by "third parties" were not illegal under the SSSI legislation. This meant that damaging activities such as fly-tipping, intensive bait-digging or trail biking on an SSSI were only prevented if done (or permitted) by the owner or occupier – not if done by trespassers or under public rights. The effect was, for example, to allow control of legal trail biking on SSSIs (where damaging to the interest), but not illegal trail biking. This loophole was closed by the Countryside and Rights of Way Act 2000 and section 19 of the Nature Conservation (Scotland) Act 2004.

Funding for the monitoring of SSSIs in England has been cut from £1.58 million in 2010 to £700,000 in 2018, causing concern that many have not been inspected over the last six years, as required by guidelines. Since the referendum to leave the EU in 2016, more than 450 staff have been transferred to the Department for Environment, Food and Rural Affairs (Defra). Neglected areas include Exmoor, the Lake District, the Pennines, and The Wash.

== Notification ==
The process of designating a site as of Special Scientific Interest is called notification; this is followed by consultation with the site's owners and occupiers, and the notification is then confirmed or withdrawn (in whole or part). At the time of the passing of the Wildlife and Countryside Act 1981, many SSSIs were already in existence, having been notified over the previous decades under the National Parks and Access to the Countryside Act 1949. Each of these was considered in turn, and either denotified, or renotified—brought under the provisions of the new Act, often with boundary changes. This complex process took some ten years to complete for the several thousand SSSIs.

For the purposes of selecting the original tranche of SSSIs, Natural England's predecessors (the Nature Conservancy, the Nature Conservancy Council and English Nature) used a system termed "areas of search" (AOSs). In England these were largely based on the 1974–1996 administrative counties (with larger counties divided into two or more areas), whereas in Scotland and Wales they are based around districts. The individual AOSs are between 400 km^{2} (150 sq mi) and 4,000 km^{2} (1,500 sq mi) in size. There were 59 AOSs in England, 12 in Wales, and 44 in Scotland. Watsonian vice-counties were formerly used for selection over the whole of Great Britain.

== See also ==
- Conservation in the United Kingdom
- Joint Nature Conservation Committee
- List of ASSIs in Northern Ireland
- List of SSSIs by Area of Search
- List of the largest Sites of Special Scientific Interest in England
- List of Sites of Special Scientific Interest in Wales
- Protected sites for nature conservation in the Isle of Man
- Natural Area Code
- Site of Special Scientific Interest (Hong Kong)
