= North East of England Process Industry Cluster =

Economic cluster

- Abbreviation: NEPIC
- Formation: September 2005
- Legal status: Not-for-profit organisation
- Headquarters: The Wilton Centre, Wilton Redcar TS10 4RF
- Location: The Wilton Centre, Wilton, Redcar TS10 4RF
- Region served: North East England
- Members: 600 participating organisations
- Chief Executive: Joanne Smith
- Main organ: Industrial Leadership Council
- Website: www.nepic.co.uk
- Remarks: EU Cluster Management Excellence Gold Label Accredited Body

The North East of England Process Industry Cluster (NEPIC) is an economic cluster developed in accordance with Michael Porter's theories and strategies regarding industrial clusters. The chemistry-using sectors in North East England, where more than 1,400 businesses are headquartered in the industry's supply chain, formed this Process Industry Cluster. In the north-east of England, the industry employs approximately 35,000 direct workers and around 190,000 indirect workers, who collectively account for more than one-third of the area's industrial economy. Companies in the cluster produce 35% of the pharmaceuticals and 50% of the petrochemicals used in the UK, making this area the only net exporter of goods from the country. The area has more than £13 billion in exports.

NEPIC was created in 2004 by the leaders of local chemistry based process industry companies that are based in the north-east of England. The aim of the organisation being to represent and coordinate industry's collaborative activities on the wide ranging issues that impact on the future and performance of the energy intensive process sector, which includes petrochemicals; specialty chemicals; polymers; pharmaceuticals; biotechnology and renewables. These issues include renewable and more sustainable energy opportunities, innovation and R&D interests, energy pricing capacity and availability, carbon taxation and carbon emission reduction technologies such as carbon capture and storage (CCS), graduate and technician skills for the sector and industry growth to ensure that the region remains a globally important location for the chemical industry.

NEPIC has been recognised by the Chemical Industries Association (CIA) in the UK for its work in informing stakeholders about the sector and by the professional institutions in the UK for its engagement and representation of industry issues. The Northeast of England is recognised and promoted by the Department for International Trade (DIT) (formerly UK Trade and Investment (UKTI)) arm of the UK Government as a leading location in the UK for Foreign Direct Investment (FDI) into the chemistry using industries.

NEPIC is led by industry through its Industry Leadership Team. These industry leaders at intervals of their choosing elect a person to be the Chair of NEPIC. Since its inception the cluster has been Chaired by Ian Shott CBE, Robert Coxon OBE, Paul Booth MBE and most recently former MP Ian Swales who is the current chair person. Dr Stan Higgins has been NEPIC's Chief Executive Officer (CEO) since its formation in 2004. Dr Higgins announced that he is to retire during 2017. On 1 June 2017 NEPIC announced that former Chair of the UK Parliamentary Business Committee and labour MP Iain Wright is to become the CEO of NEPIC.

== Strategy for growth ==
The Industry Leadership Council of NEPIC regularly revisits the Cluster's Strategy for Growth, after first publishing it in 2006. NEPIC and the Industrialists concerned were commended for this work in the UK Parliament. The NEPIC Strategy is published and approved at the organisation's Annual General Meeting (AGM). The most recent strategy was published in December 2012.

== Performance ==
=== GVA creation ===
NEPIC's overall performance against its strategy and as a Cluster body is measured in terms of economic development within its region. This is monitored by its Industry Leadership Council and public sector observers through key performance indicators (KPIs). These mostly relate to the cluster's results in attracting and assisting both indigenous and foreign direct investment (FDI) investment, as well as business growth in the local SME supply chain and any resulting job creation. These factors contribute to an overall performance measure of Gross Value Added (GVA). Results from the six year period 2005 to 2011 show that through its industry led activities, by 2017, NEPIC's activities are contributing significant levels of GVA to its local economy. to the UK economy.

In December 2013, NEPIC reported to its local Members of Parliament that since 2005 the Cluster had secured 83 significant investments and 4,000 jobs which now contributes more than £2 billion GVA to the local and UK economy. The ongoing work of the Cluster particularly with the Small & Medium Size (SME) business community via the Clusters Business Acceleration for SMEs (BASME) project has seen the Clusters impact on its local economy grow to £2.5 billion of GVA per annum by 2015. By 2017 the total GVA contribution of NEPIC had climbed to £3.34 billion.

=== Process industry investment ===
Between 2005 and 2013 the NEPIC, cluster members, and its local authority partners helped to secure 83 significant investments into the process industry in the region totalling £3.7 billion. The companies making significant investment during this period into the Cluster footprint include:

- Aesica Pharmaceuticals
- Air Products and Chemicals
- Akzo Nobel
- Banner Chemicals
- Biffa Polymers
- Biochemica
- BOC -Linde
- BP CATS
- CatalSystems Limited
- Chemoxy International
- Cleveland Biotechnology
- Cleveland Potash
- Clugston
- ConocoPhillips
- Costain RWE
- CPI Group of Companies
- Dalkia
- AV-Dawson
- Dow
- Emerald Biogas
- Ensus
- Eon
- Fine Organics
- Fujifilm Diosynth Biotechnologies
- Fulbeck
- Graphite Resources
- Greenergy
- Growhow
- GlaxoSmithKline
- Hammerite
- Hart Biologicals
- Harvest Energy
- High Force Research
- Huntsman Polyurethanes
- Huntsman Tioxide
- Impetus
- Ineos Nitriles
- International Paints
- Johnson Matthey
- Kannect Precision Services
- Lotte Chemicals
- Lucite International
- Mitsubishi
- MSD
- Niramax
- Northumbrian Water
- Plaxica
- PX Limited
- SABIC
- SCM Pharma
- Specials Labs
- Scott Brothers
- Sembcorp
- Shasun Pharma Solutions
- Specials Labs
- SITA
- SNF Floerger
- Sahaviriya Steel Industries (SSI)
- Tata Steel Teesside Technology
- Thermo Fisher Scientific
- Trygg /Epax Pharma
- Veolia Waste Processing
- Victrex
- Wilton Centre

Many of the above projects and those of other NEPIC member companies have been assisted in their investment plans by grants made available by the United Kingdom Government. The Regional Growth Fund (RGF) has supported many projects within the Cluster footprint.

By 2017 the Cluster reported that it has been involved in landing 95 process industry investments into its region worth well over £4 billion and adding 5,000 jobs.

== Collaborative projects ==
NEPIC has participated in a number of European Union funded cluster collaboration projects and collaborative innovation projects, thereby enabling its members to participate and access the benchmarking and business best practice that is being developed and shared. On some occasions NEPIC participates in the role as project leader/manager and in others as a partner organisation. An example of a Cluster collaboration in which NEPIC is a partner is the WIINTECH project, a worldwide intercluster initiative for new materials and processes focused on clean technologies. This collaborative project is aimed at building a common international strategy between 8 leading European clusters and to foster inter-cluster and transnational partnerships, extending international cooperation and developing a joint inter-cluster projects in areas such as technology and industrial partnerships, training & skills development, technology transfer, workforce and business mobility and business mentoring. NEPIC and the other Clusters involved have undertaken joint market visits to Japan, USA, Korea, Brazil, and India to promote the EU process industries while focusing on fast growing lead markets such as clean technology. The LOCIMAP collaboration on the other hand is a project that is being led and managed by NEPIC with 13 international partners who together are investigating best practice and developing new ideas for the development of more efficient industrial parks in the future.

== Business support ==
NEPIC provides technical, funding and business advice to new investors and indigenous businesses.

To assist with industry attraction and growth, NEPIC supports companies in securing their major capital projects, management buyouts (MBO) and start-ups. The Cluster provides intelligence on local supply chain capabilities in areas such as site location, planning, infrastructure, raw material sourcing, engineering, logistics, measurement science, workforce development and legal advice. To deliver projects NEPIC partners with its Local Enterprise Partnerships (LEP) Tees Valley Unlimited and the North East LEP (NELEP). It works internationally to attract investment and partners with other European locations for the chemical industry through the European Chemical Site Promotion Platform (ECSPP).

In line with the Cluster's strategy, NEPIC manages several business support products to help SMEs grow. The Cluster secured a Regional Growth Fund project to mentor 400 SMEs in this region into new business within the process sector. This is the Business Acceleration for SMEs (BASME) project through which 1000 jobs were created in the process sector supply chain over 3 years. More than 200 SME's signed up to this programme in the first 18 months and created over 170 jobs. The BASME programme has enabled NEPIC to increase the interaction between process industry companies and their local supply chain such that after 30 months 327 SMEs had engaged with it adding 425 jobs. When complete, over 3 years, the BASME project reported that it had worked with 423 SMEs and helped them with business development that resulted in 1011 jobs.

Similarly NEPIC created a programme to mentor 120 SMEs to improve their carbon efficiency and to accredit their sustainability credentials. This enabled some of NEPIC's SME member's supply chain data to be available to Tier 1 companies which from 2013 onwards, in the UK, are expected to have a mandatory requirement to supply their carbon footprints on an annual basis. NEPIC's scheme called Developing Low Carbon Sustainable Industry (DEELOCSI) receives financial support from the European Regional Development Fund (ERDF) of the European Union.

To further encourage SMEs in the north-east of England to Export, NEPIC collaborated with the North East Chamber of Commerce (NECC) and RTC North Limited to create a jointly owned subsidiary company Go Global Limited to manage the contract they had to deliver the United Kingdom Trade & Investment (UKTI) (2016 onwards UKTI became the Department for International Trade – DIT), Government funded, support products and programme for all business sectors in their region. The UKTI business support products, to help grow international trade, are aimed at supporting individual SMEs to grow their exports and they also support the Cluster and its members with trade missions to new markets.

In order to share knowledge with and support other business sectors in the north-east of England, NEPIC is a member of the Northern Business Forum (NBF). This business led forum also links the Cluster to wider business issues, both locally and nationally, through the local & national business membership organisations represented. Members of the forum include the Federation of Small Businesses (FSB), Confederation of British Industry (CBI) North East, the Engineering Employers Federation Northern (EEF), The Institute of Directors (IOD), The North East Chamber of Commerce (NECC), Service Network, RTC North and NEPIC. The Association of North East Councils (ANEC) are amongst the observers of the forum.

== Tees ==
=== Teesport ===
Teesport is based on the River Tees and is currently the third largest port in the United Kingdom, and amongst the ten biggest in Western Europe. This port handles over 56 million tonnes of goods per annum which are mainly associated with the local petrochemical, chemical and steel processing industries. The port is important infrastructure for the NEPIC cluster of process companies.

=== Large-scale integrated chemical processing ===
The larger, and in a number of instances, integrated chemical producers in the NEPIC Cluster are based on Teesside on three large chemical sites around the mouth of the River Tees at Wilton, Billingham and Seal Sands that were formerly owned and operated by Imperial Chemical Industries (ICI). These locations have a long history of large scale chemical manufacturing even before the creation of ICI. The large scale manufacturing companies operating on these sites are sometimes called "commodity chemical manufacturers" and they make products such as petrochemicals, fertilizers and polymers.

=== Integrated Manufacturers Group ===
The large scale, commodity chemical producers on Teesside work through NEPIC's Integrated Manufacturers Group (IMG) where they exchange information on infrastructure issues and also share intelligence on engineering resources for large maintenance / overhauls and capital investment projects. Such projects in the chemical process sector can require hundreds of additional contract engineers for short intense periods of time and this requires extensive engineering planning. The maintenance of chemical plant is an engineering profession in its own right.

=== Carbon Capture and Storage (CCS) ===
The NEPIC IMG of manufacturers are amongst the largest single point producers of carbon dioxide in the United Kingdom and they have created within NEPIC the Process Industry Carbon Capture and Storage Initiative (PICCSI) to study the possibility of a carbon capture and storage (CCS) solution being provided for industry on Teesside as well as for any carbon based energy production. This CCS technology option is being considered as a result of climate change regulations and the carbon taxation that could become a prohibitive cost for such energy intensive industries.

== Shale gas and underground coal gasification ==
NEPIC members are also studying the prospect of energy production from unconventional gas sources including energy from waste, energy from biomass, shale gas and underground coal gasification. Several energy from waste plants are already present in this region and more are being constructed. The region is close to large reserves of shale gas and coal and commercial exploitation of these reserves is being considered. The shale gas deposits close to this region that are available for exploitation by the process known as "fracking" exceed 1.3 quadrillion cubic feet of natural gas, although not all of this will be extractable. The extraction of shale gas in the UK has been the subject of two major reports, one from the Institute of Directors called "Getting Shale Gas Working" and one from the UK Government entitled the "Bowland Shale Gas Study". In addition, the region has substantial unexploited coal reserves in the Durham Coalfield and companies are developing plans to exploit this using modern clean technologies for underground coal gasification (UCG). Linking technologies for UGC or other gas extraction from local coalfields to carbon dioxide capture technologies like those described in the "Teesside Collective Project" gives rise to the prospect of "Clean Coal" as a source of raw materials for the chemical sector in the north-east of England.

== Integrating industry ==
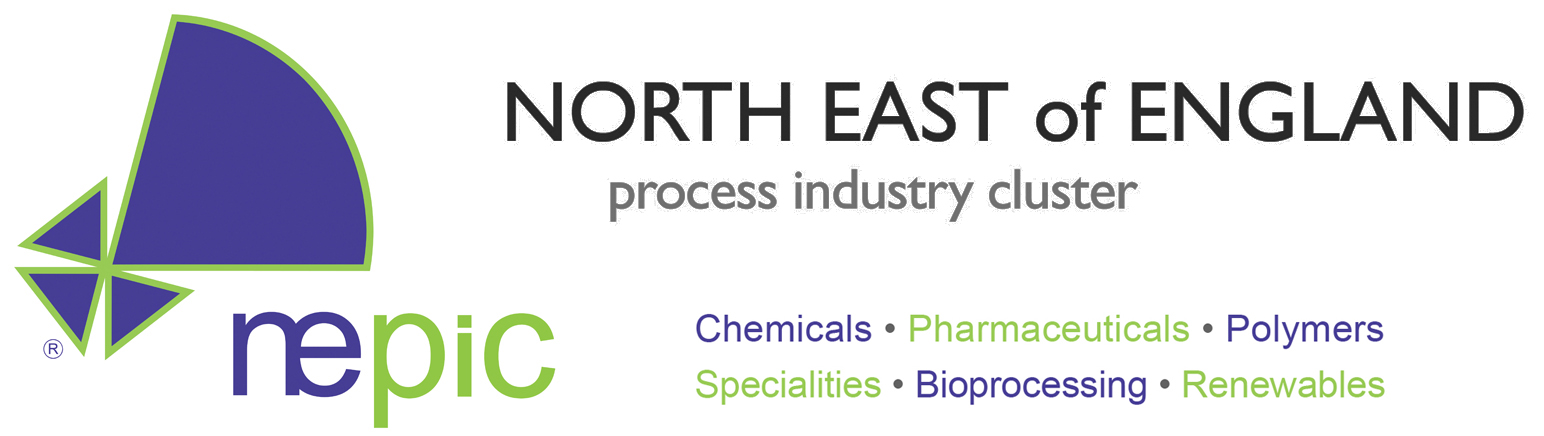
NEPIC logo and sectors

NEPIC has two offices in the region: one in the north in Sunderland and one in the south at Wilton near Redcar in Teesside. At the Wilton location, NEPIC is amongst several process sector and supply chain companies that work out of the process industry research centre Wilton International. The UK Innovation Catapult, the Centre for Process Innovation, is also based in this multi-occupancy technical development centre.

=== Chemicals ===
The chemical companies in the membership of NEPIC can be categorised into three groups: petrochemical, commodity chemical, fine and speciality chemical companies. The petrochemical and commodity chemical companies are those most likely to utilise large infrastructure such as pipelines, storage facilities, utilities, power stations, port facilities and railways. These companies in this Cluster are almost exclusively based on Teesside, mostly on three chemical industrial parks at Wilton, Billingham and Seal Sands. Examples of large scale commodity manufacturers in the NEPIC Cluster are Sabic making ethylene, low-density polyethylene and aromatics, Ineos acrylonitrile, GrowHow ammonia and ammonia based fertilizers, Ensus bioethanol and animal feed, Phillips 66 oil refining, Omya Calcium Carbonate, Huntsman polyurethane intermediates and titanium dioxide, Harvest Energy biodiesel and Greenergy fuel blending. These commodity chemical companies used to share logistical, utility and other infrastructure with Sahaviriya Steel Industries (SSI) who made steel in Redcar until final closure in October 2015. This was Europe's second largest operational blast furnace. TATA Steel still operate steel milling and rolling units on Teesside.

The speciality chemical and fine chemical companies in the NEPIC Cluster are spread across all the sub-regions of north-east England including Teesside, County Durham, Tyne and Wear and Northumberland. Examples on Teesside: Fine Organics, Chemoxy, Vertellus, Johnson Matthey, Koppers, Lucite International and Mitsubishi Chemicals. In County Durham: High Force Research, Newchem Technologies, Thomas Swan, Exwold Technology and Huntsman Tioxide, and Frutarom. In Tyne and Wear and Northumberland Kilfrost, Akzo & International Paint and Chemson all manufacture speciality chemicals while Aesica, Sterling Pharma Solutions and Piramal make and use fine chemical intermediates mostly as pharmaceutical intermediates. Companies in the NEPIC footprint are also involved in the scale up, manufacture and commercialisation of Graphene, Applied Graphene Materials and Thomas Swan Limited. The UK Government has also chosen this Cluster to base its National Graphene Applications Centre.

The above chemical companies are also supported by specialist utility providers and speciality gas providers such as Sembcorp and BOC-Linde, bulk storage businesses such as Simon Storage and Vopak, while speciality packaging and formulation of chemicals is provided by companies such as Banner Chemicals, MP Storage and Exwold who also all operate Teesside facilities. Throughout the whole region Northumbrian Water can provide bulk water and also waste water treatment facilities to the all sectors of the process industry. The region is self-sufficient in water and can allocate industrial quantities to new investors due to the development of the Kielder Reservoir.

=== Polymers ===
Polymer manufacturing in the north-east of England Process Industry Cluster has some large-scale activity based on Teesside. SABIC operate one of the world's biggest low-density polyethylene (LDPE) plants, which makes the United Kingdom a net exporter of LDPE. Lotte Chemical manufacture both purified terephthalic acid (PTA) and polyethylene terephthalate (PET). Ineos manufacture acrylonitrile, an intermediate used for Nylon 66 and acrylics. Speciality polymer products are also made there. Ineos, for example, also manufacture aqueous polyvinylchloride PVC products in County Durham whilst Victrex manufacture all the monomer for their polyether ether ketone (PEEK) product at their facility on Teesside. There are also new biopolymers and resins in development and scale up by companies such as Plaxica, which is developing new processes to commercialise polylactic acid (PLA) and Cambridge Biopolymers, who are commercialising functional bioresins; both are based at the Teesside process industry research centre Wilton International.

New processes for the recycling of polymers have also been commercialised at Wilton. For example, Biffa Polymers recycle a large percentage of the UK's plastic milk bottles into polymer chip. This was one of the first technology applications which allowed food-grade polymer packaging to be recycled without passing through a melted phase. In 2013, SNF announced that they intend to build a polymer manufacturing unit on Teesside to make polyacrylamide emulsion for the oil industry. Although not strictly a polymer, the acrylic Perspex is a well known plastic like material; it and other acrylic products are manufactured in Teesside and County Durham by Lucite International, which is a subsidiary of Mitsubishi corporation.

The region also has a significant number of polymer extrusion and forming companies that supply a number of advanced engineering supply chains notably the automobile supply chain which, in north-east England, is dominated by Nissan's European automobile manufacturing plant at Sunderland. The automobile supply chain in this region is represented by the North East Automobile Alliance (NEAA).

=== Pharmaceuticals ===
The region has a pharmaceutical industry encompassing multiple stages of the value chain, including drug discovery and development, clinical research, clinical trial management and manufacturing at both pilot and commercial scales. Activities also include formulation, packaging and distribution.

Within the North East of England Process Industry Cluster (NEPIC), companies provide a range of supporting services, including laboratory facilities, manufacturing infrastructure, logistics, construction and procurement, analytical services, validation, maintenance, operations, financial services, public relations and contingency planning.

Fundamental medical research is done in this region at several of its universities. For example, Newcastle University was the first to receive a licence in the UK to perform research on stem cells and this is a leading centre for such research today. Indeed Karim Nayernia was the first to isolate spermatogonial stem cells at this University. Many new healthcare developments have arisen from this research work.

Industrial drug development continues at ARCINOVA in Alnwick. Small molecule drug scale-up and process development and manufacture is provided to current good manufacturing practice(cGMP) standards to pharmaceutical companies around the world by several NEPIC Cluster members such as Aesica Pharmaceuticals, Sterling Pharma Solutions, Piramal Healthcare, all of which are based in Northumberland and also by Fine Organics on Teesside. Aesica, Sterling, Piramal (Northumberland) are companies that perform primary manufacture of active pharmaceutical ingredients(APIs) to cGMP standards. While Aesica, Piramal, MSD (Northumberland), Sanofi (Tyne & Wear), GlaxoSmithKline, Quantum Pharmaceuticals and Bristol Laboratories in (County Durham) are all secondary pharmaceutical manufacturers with large facilities in the region. These companies formulate and package finished pharmaceuticals ready for consumer use. Small quantity and speciality pharmaceutical formulations are also manufactured by contract manufacturers Specials Labs and SCM Pharma in Northumberland, which was acquired by Shire Pharmaceuticals in 2014. While Fujifilm Diosynth Biotechnologies (Teesside), formerly Avecia is one of the largest investments in the world in biopharmaceutical & biologics medicines manufacturing, the company manufactures, under contract, active biopharmaceuticals for a number of pharmaceutical companies. Pharmaceuticals make up a significant proportion of the exports of the north-east of England. The region produces 33% of the UK's GDP in pharmaceutical manufacturing with 95% of finished product exported to global markets

=== Biotechnology ===
Biotechnology has become widely used in many industrial and academic activities and the following classifications have become established. Red Biotechnology – Medical, Health care and Pharmaceutical Biotechnology. White Biotechnology – Biotechnology for industrial products. Green Biotechnology – Biotechnology applied to environmental issues. Blue Biotechnology – Biotechnology based on marine organisms. The north-east of England has strengths in all these areas.

Industrial and academic biotechnological research in Red Biotechnology has been well established in the north-east England and has developed into strengths in diagnostics, bioinformatics, Biomanufacturing, Biocatalysis & Bio-transformations, Bioremediation, Pharmaceutical research, Microbiological analysis and testing, Production of antibodies, proteins and peptides. Leading edge research is done at the region's Universities, for example Newcastle University was the first institution in Europe, second in the world, to receive permission to pursue stem-cell research in human embryos.

New industries that have now developed form a significant sector in the Northeast of England Process Industry Cluster (NEPIC). Fujifilm Diosynth Biologics at Billingham now employs over 550 people, the majority of them being graduate-level skills in biotechnology, to develop new products and innovative processes for the pharmaceutical industry. Within a mile of the Fujifilm complex are small companies working on the building blocks of life. Cambridge Research Biochemicals (CRB) supports discovery research activities by providing custom-made research reagents, principally peptides and antibodies. In Sunderland, Immuno Diagnostic Systems (IDS) are producing medical test kits and in Hartlepool Hart Biologicals produce diagnostic products for use in the detection, prevention, and monitoring of a number of medical conditions. In Morpeth, Northumberland Piramal Healthcare invested into bio-pharmaceutical manufacturing facilities.

Across the region, companies such as Leica Biosystems, Orla Proteins, Helena Bioscience, Thermo Fischer Scientific and Millipore are significant contributors to the growing strength of the sector and its supply chain.

Industrial, White Biotechnology includes manufacturing, alternative energy (or "bioenergy"), and biomaterials and is also well established in the region. The manufacturers of the food protein Quorn, Marlow Foods, now part of Premier Foods, developed their technology here and still operate in this region. Northumbrian Water has invested in two large scale anaerobic digestion facilities to recover energy from their domestic and industrial waste water streams. In Stockton-on-Tees, Cleveland Biotechnology has been pioneering natural solutions to handling effluents and waste materials. In Billingham, Biochemica is applying new biotechnology solutions to industrial water treatment. Biotechnology is also being applied to manufacture polymers by Plaxica and functional resins by Cambridge Biopolymers. Several of the Cluster's Fine and Specialty chemical companies are utilising enzymatic transformations in their manufacturing processes. Developments such as these are being supported by The Centre for Process Innovation (CPI) which hosts the National Industrial Biotechnology Facility (NIBF) at Wilton International.

=== Renewables and bioresources ===
Members of the North East England Process Industry Cluster (NEPIC) are also focusing on development of biorefinery concepts which could impact on fine, speciality and commodity chemicals, pharmaceuticals, agrochemicals and bio-fuels such as bioethanol and biodiesel. Large scale biofuels plants are already operating on Teesside by Ensus and Harvest Energy, while Greenergy (note: Harvest and Greenergy are all now part of the Interterminals Group) operate a biofuel blending facility. CF Industries (formerly GrowHow) who manufacture fertilizer is capturing carbon dioxide from their ammonia based fertilizer business and this is being used to aid the growing of tomatoes in an industrial market garden on Teesside. This reduces emissions and eliminates road miles from former European imports. Sembcorp operate a 30 MW biomass power plant known as Wilton 10 using both waste wood and coppiced wood, which is integrated into the existing chemical processes on the Wilton Chemical Site. A number of other biomass and waste to energy plants are in development within the Cluster such as Wilton 11 and MGT Power are building their Teesport Renewable Energy Plant. SITA already operate an energy from waste unit in Middlesbrough. Many of the Cluster companies working on Renewables and Bioresources projects to develop a lower carbon future for the sector collaborate through the NEPIC Clusters Bioresources Collaborative Thrust Team. The Cluster's growing strength in low carbon, sustainable industry has gained national recognition.

The drive to industrialise biorefinery technologies within the NEPIC Cluster is mostly aimed at reducing carbon emissions or at making manufacturing more sustainable by counterbalancing the emissions by the reabsorption of carbon dioxide through the growth of an equivalent amount of biomass. Alternatively they are implementing technologies that enable the use of societal waste as a new basic raw material. The Chemical Engineering technologies that are being implemented include advanced gasification and Air Products and Chemicals are implementing their plasma gasification technology on Teesside, the company has announced that a second such unit is also to be built in this location. Others are developing projects utilising pyrolysis to recover useful materials from carbon wastes and also new processes to manufacture biosynthetic natural gas (SNG)and fuels from air being developed by Air Fuels Synthesis. Depolymerisation processes are also under investigation.

The Cluster companies and new investors collaborating through the Northeast of England Process Industry Cluster (NEPIC) on renewables and bioresources projects do so through the Cluster's Bioresources Thrust Team.

== Supply chain ==
The Chemical, Pharmaceutical, Speciality, Biotechnology companies cannot operate without the support of an extensive local supply chain. Supply Chain companies within NEPIC include Analytical and Measurement Science Companies, Chemical Engineering, Control Engineering, Mechanical Engineering, Process Engineering, Project Engineering, Construction Engineering, Maintenance Engineering, Toolmakers, Business and Site Security, Safety Management, Disaster and Business Recovery Management, Engineering Equipment Suppliers, Laboratory Equipment Suppliers, Business Performance Improvement Consultants, Legal Firms, Management & Strategy Consultants, Process Development, Publicity Firms, Publishers and Printers, Purchasing Companies, Recruitment Companies, Research Institutions etc.

The concentration of such supply chain businesses in the north-east of England is internationally significant. In 2009 Service Network commissioned Shared Intelligence and Gavurin to undertake an assessment of the Knowledge Intensive Business & Services (KIBS) sector in the north-east of England. The report concludes that KIBS companies are distributed across the whole of the region. It identifies that the region has a particular strength in Architectural & Engineering Activities & Related Technical Consultancy (AETC) workplaces with 2810 such firms employing 13,385 people. The report also identifies that the concentration of ATEC business is the highest in the UK and around Stockton-on-Tees the concentration is amongst the highest for such businesses in Europe.

== Role of the cluster ==
According to Christian Ketels of Harvard Business School "Globalisation has not only raised the relative role of location and Clusters, it has raised the bar in terms of the demands that successful clusters have to meet." Ketels suggests that this is because competition between clusters has increased and rival locations are vying for any new investment in their sectors. It is this that pressurises Cluster organisations to meet the best practice of clusters in other regions. Such competition has driven clusters to become more specialised and there is now much more differentiation, for example, some clusters are R&D Hubs while others focus on manufacturing or are service orientated. Ketels' premise is that this increasing level of specialisation has increased linkages between cluster bodies and that the ability of the cluster management teams to make such linkages and partnerships has become an important key strength. In the past, Ketels suggests, clusters were like islands competing with each other whereas now they are part of Global supply chains often competing and co-operating at the same time.

Ketels' observations are borne out by the work of the Northeast of England Process Industry Cluster (NEPIC) which uses its cluster to cluster links in two ways to meet the strategic needs of its Industrial Leadership Council. Firstly, to meet its Internationalisation aims, NEPIC's cluster to cluster activities build up a wider international understanding of the capabilities of the industry in its region and also of its members specific businesses. Secondly, it uses cluster to cluster relationships to help develop the business, particularly of its Small and Medium Enterprise (SME) members, with the aim of strengthening SME businesses in its local supply chain. NEPIC does this by using its international linkages and partnerships to de-risk the initial development of international trade for its members. This is achieved by reciprocal knowledge and support of partner clusters and trade bodies and their members. NEPIC's approach is to develop formal Memoranda of Understanding (MOUs)with industry clusters and business associations around the world and build partnerships to create knowledge sharing opportunities.

In Europe, NEPIC has projects and agreements with the following Cluster bodies: Axelera, and through the WIINTECH consortium, Plastipolis in France, Proplast in Italy, Chemie-Cluster Bayern (CCB) in Germany, Clusterland in Austria, Plastival in Spain, Veneto Nanotech in Italy and Poolnet in Portugal. In India, with the Indian Chemical Council (ICC), the Karnataka Drug and Pharmaceutical Manufacturers Association (KDPMA), Gujarat Chemical Association, Vapi Industries Association, Mangalore Special Economic Zone (MSEZ) and Plastindia. In Brazil, with the Suape Coplexo Industria Portuario and in China the Jiangsu Association of Science and Technology (JASTI). NEPIC has participated in joint meetings and projects with these organisations and has often managed reciprocal visits from groups of companies associated with the aforementioned bodies and countries.

These partnerships can lead to joint projects, for example, NEPIC and the Indian Chemical Council (ICC) jointly organised the Indian Chemical Industry Outlook Conference in 2013. Furthermore member companies have found new business via such Cluster to Cluster relationships, for example one SME business attending the Indian Outlook Conference in India in 2013 reported in the market visit blog that "the quality, seniority and number of attendees that NEPIC (and ICC) have attracted are of great credit to them. I have calculated that it would have taken me at least 4 years to meet the executives that have met in one week on this trip." At the same time others reported new business being created during their first market visit with the Cluster.

By 2017 NEPIC had become a partner of the Indian Chemical Council (ICC) helping to define the agenda for their Annual Outlook Conference. The 2017 NEPIC led and UK Department for International Trade (DIT) trade mission to India had grown to include 21 business delegates who travelled to Bangalore, Pune and Mumbai meeting companies the company members of the Karnataka Drug and Pharmaceutical Association (KDPMA), Tata Research Development and Design Centre and the members of the Indian Chemical Council. With companies such as Jacobs Engineering, SMEs such as Biochimica UK Limited (water treatment), Micropore Technologies Limited (innovative dispersion & emulsification technology) and Harrison Goddard Foote (HGF) (patent agents) being positive about their experience and showing the supply chain diversity. These companies show the diversity of the chemical process industry supply chain.

== See also ==
- Institution of Chemical Engineers
- UK Trade & Investment
- Economic clusters
- Chemical Industries Association
- Commodity chemicals
- Fine chemicals
- Speciality chemicals
- Pharmaceuticals
- Biotechnology
- Chemical plant
- Chemical Engineering
- Cluster Initiative Greenbook
