= Teesside Refinery =

Oil refinery and chemical plant in River Tees, County Durham

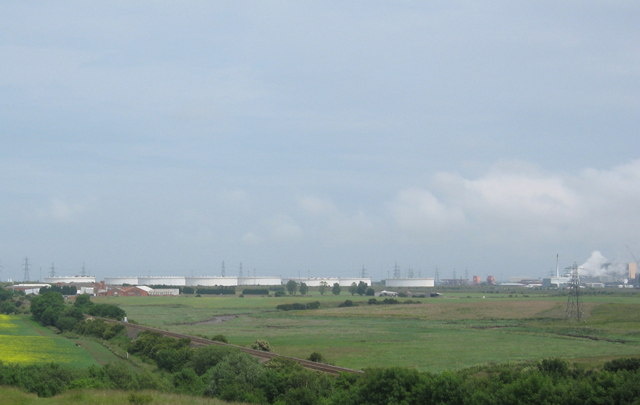
- Tank Farm at Greatham

- Location within County Durham
- Location: Seaton Carew, Hartlepool, County Durham, England, United Kingdom; 54.6338°N 1.2189°W

Refinery details
- Owner: Petroplus
- Closed: 2009

The Teesside Refinery was an oil refinery and chemical plant situated just south of Seaton Carew on the River Tees in County Durham. In 2000, it was bought by Petroplus from ICI and Phillips Petroleum Company. Refining was suspended in 2009, although the site continues to operate as a terminal and storage facility.

== History ==
In the period 1965–1968, three oil refineries were developed close to Teesport on the River Tees, thanks to the Phillips Petroleum's development of the Ekofisk oil field in the North Sea. The first two were jointly developed and operated by Phillips and ICI on the north shore of the River Tees, just south of Greatham Creek. After processing this facility fed cyclohexane, benzene, toluene and xylene to ICI's chemical plants at Billingham and Wilton. The third refinery was developed in 1968 by Shell Oil on the south shore within Teesport.

In 1980, with the discovery of North Sea gas, a 220 miles (350 km) pipeline was installed between Ekofisk and Seal Sands on the north shore. Although the Shell refinery was mothballed in 1989 and later closed, as a result of the pipeline petrochemicals traffic still today represents about 50% of the cargo through Teesport, around 26 million tonnes a year.

== Operations ==
Today the Teesside Refinery is a crude oil reception, storage and trans-shipment installation. Operations consist of both processing and tanker loading facilities and cover a 307 acres (124 ha) site. Stabilised oil is stored in a 375 acres (152 ha) tank farm at Greatham. A 2 miles (3.2 km) corridor containing pipelines, communications and utility services links the two sites, operated jointly by 270 employees.

In its 35 years of operations, the terminal has processed over five billion barrels of oil, seen 15,000 ships visit their jetties and had a first-class safety record. The plant has also been run with a downtime of less than 24 hours in 30 years.

On site there is a canteen, an active sports and social club and People SPIRIT team who organise a variety of activities. When owned by ConocoPhillips they continually funded technical apprenticeship schemes in the area, and were directly involved in local primary and secondary school education. Initiatives ranged from donating computers and funding school exchange programmes, to providing engineers for maths and science days.

=== Accreditation ===
The Teesside terminal is certified to ISO 14001, the international environmental management system standard, which it has held continuously since October 1998. The site is on the fringe of the estuary mudflats of Seal Sands, an area of considerable conservation interest and home to wildfowl and seal colonies.

=== Awards ===
The terminal has received numerous gold medals and President's awards from the Royal Society for the Prevention of Accidents (RoSPA) over the years. These awards are in recognition of the site's occupational safety achievements acknowledging successful management of occupational health and accident prevention.

== Refining suspended ==
On 9 November 2009, The Engineer reported that refining was to be suspended at the Teesside refinery. Petroplus CEO Jean-Paul Vettier was quoted as saying: "Given the current unfavorable market environment and capital expenditures required to maintain refinery operations at Teesside, we have decided to suspend refinery operations. The site will continue to operate as a terminal and storage facility."

On 24 January 2012 it was announced that Petroplus would file for insolvency, which led to the closure of Coryton Refinery. Teesside closed shortly afterwards and was bought by Greenergy in July 2012, reopening as a diesel, gasoil and kerosene supply depot in November 2012.

== See also ==
- Oil refinery
- Petroleum
- List of oil refineries
