= Teesport =

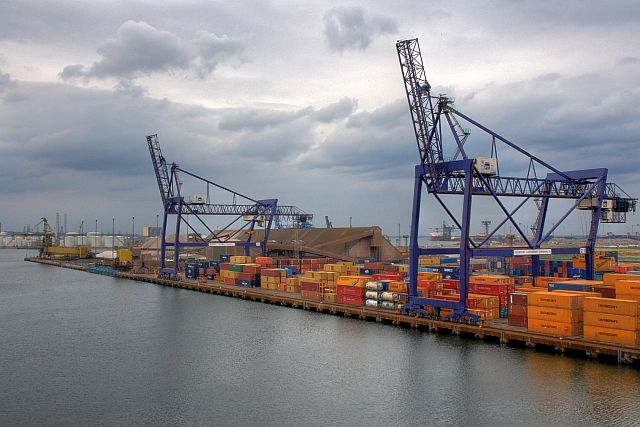
- Container terminal TCT1, August 2009

Location
- Country: United Kingdom
- Location: River Tees, Middlesbrough, North Yorkshire
- Coordinates: 54.604°N 1.158°W

Details
- Owned by: PD Ports
- Land area: 200 hectares (490 acres)

Statistics
- Vessel arrivals: 6,000
- Annual cargo tonnage: 56 million tonnes
- Annual container volume: 500,000 TEU
- Website; Teesport @ PDPorts

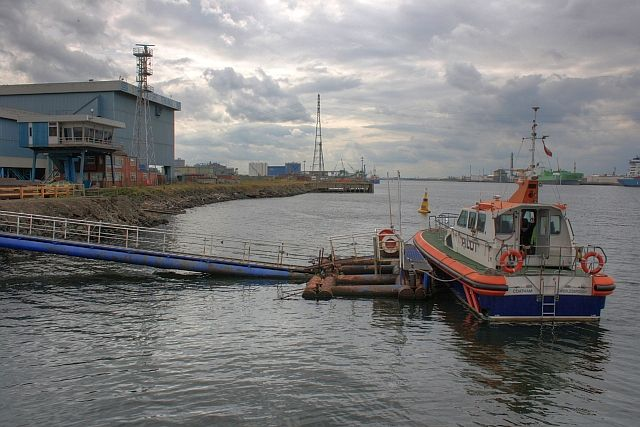
Pilot's pontoon with view upstream, August 2009

Teesport is a large sea port located in the unitary authority of Redcar and Cleveland, in the ceremonial county of North Yorkshire, Northern England.

Owned by PD Ports, it is located approximately 1 mile (2 km) inland from the North Sea and 4 miles (6 km) east of Middlesbrough on the River Tees. Teesport is currently the third largest port in the United Kingdom, and amongst the ten biggest in Western Europe, handling over 56 million tonnes of domestic and international cargo per year.

== Description ==
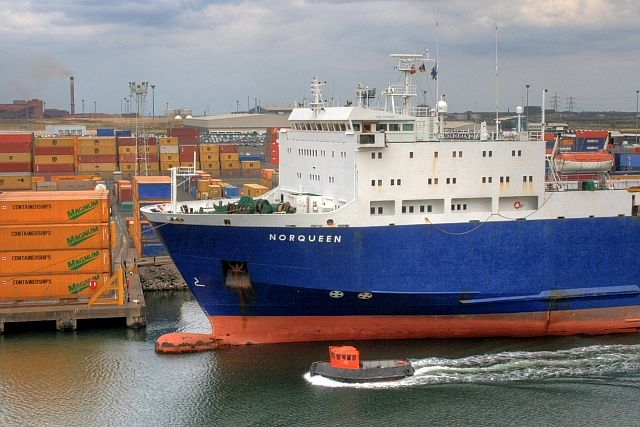
A tug passes P&O Ferries M/V Norqueen which operates the RORO route to Rotterdam

The port covers an area of 200 hectares (490 acres) of land alongside the southern bank of the River Tees. Presently handling over 6,000 ships and 56 million tonnes of cargo per annum, Teesport is mostly associated with the handling of steel, petrochemical, manufacturing, engineering and retail. Teesport is the logistical hub for the commodity chemical and steel companies that are members of the Northeast of England Process Industry Cluster (NEPIC).

=== Facilities ===
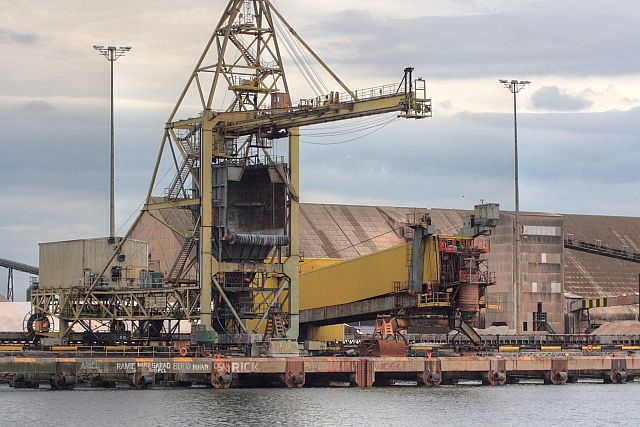
Potash terminal, August 2009

Teesport's facilities include:

- Tees Dock Terminal: handling bulk cargo, which accounts for 73% of the port's volume.
  - Cleveland Potash bulk terminal: handles more than a million tons of potash and salt exports, mainly from Boulby Mine
  - Steel Export Terminal: equipped with eight gantry cranes, it handles over a million tons of steel slab export a year. Can also handle wood imports, including tropical hardwood, fiberboard, plus softwood and pulp from Scandinavia
- Teesport Container Terminals: two computerised Container quays, capable of handling 500,000 TEU per annum
  - TCT1 at 294 metres (965 ft), which can hold 1,872 TEU at quayside
  - TCT2 at 360 metres (1,180 ft), specifically developed deep-sea cargo quay which presently handles customers including CMA CGM. TCT2 has its own specifically built railhead, which was developed in partnership with DB Cargo UK
- Roll-on/roll-off: P&O Ferries operates eight sailings to Rotterdam and six to Zeebrugge per week. An extension of 23 hectares (57 acres) allows the import of 100,000 cars by Renault, while General Motors sub-leases 5 hectares (12 acres)
- Dawson's Wharf: handles dry cargo from a 500 metres (1,600 ft) river-facing quay, handling 400 thousand tonnes of bulk minerals and non-hazardous chemicals
- Cochrane's Wharf: a 5 hectares (12 acres) site operated by Tarmac Aggregates for the import of dredged marine materials

=== Landside ===
Landside clients include Hanson plc who operate a cement plant that also utilises Ground granulated blast-furnace slag, and a landfill site which uses non-hazardous waste to backfill the site of the former Tees Dock facility. Tesco operate a 1,200,000 feet (370,000 m) high-bay non-food storage and distribution facility at Teesport. The currently under-construction Teesport Renewable Energy Plant is scheduled to come into operation in 2020.

=== Northern Gateway Terminal ===
In February 2008, PD Ports were given planning permission to redevelop the former Shell Oil refinery in a £350 million scheme that would create a new container facility, entitled the Northern Gateway Terminal, which would raise TEU capacity of the entire port to 1.5 million TEU. However, due to the 2008 economic downturn, PD Ports put back the start of development until 2010 at the earliest, with the programme now scheduled to complete in 2020.

=== Transport connections ===
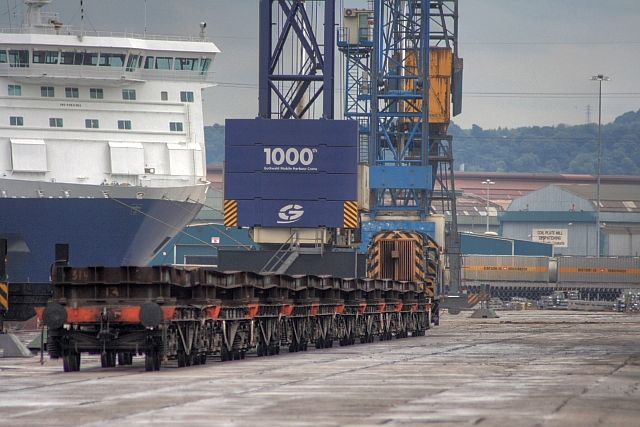
A former-British Rail Class 08 shunting locomotive on hire from RMS Locotec propels steel stock past P&O Ferries M/V Norsky RORO ship, August 2009

PD Ports leases a number of former-British Rail Class 08 shunting locomotives from RMS Locotec to move rail traffic around the port, and to/from the two main associated marshalling yards. The port is directly rail connected to the East Coast Main Line and the Durham Coast Line, and close to the A66 trans-pennine route, and other major trunk roads.

== History ==
The first developed facility on the current Teesport location was a Royal Navy depot during the First World War. This allowed the allocated six British E-class submarines to operate further into the North Sea during their defence, attack and mine laying operations against the Imperial German Navy. At this time, commercial port facilities were still handled at Middlesbrough Docks, located further upstream.

In the 1920s, Eston Urban District Council decided to turn the 13 former dormitories of the former Royal Navy facility into 38 small houses, within a community called Teesport. By the start of World War II, of the original 130 residents that came when the community was developed, only 3 remained. This was because in 1934, the joint owners of the land on which the community was built – riverside and shoreline Swan Hunter & Wigham Richardson; landside Dorman Long – had written to the council to seek assurances that they would not let any more houses within the community, so allowing the land owners to take back possession and be allowed to develop their businesses on the land. After the war, due to over-crowding around the original Port Darlington and Middlesbrough Docks facility, both companies developed industrial facilities on the land, and sub-leased some land to other commercial operations.

Between 1965 and 1968, three oil refineries were developed close to Teesport, thanks to the Phillips Petroleum's development of the Ekofisk oil field in the North Sea. The first two were jointly developed and operated by Phillips and ICI on the north shore of the River Tees at the North Tees Works, just south of Greatham Creek. After processing this facility fed cyclohexane, benzene, toluene and xylene to ICI's chemical plants at Billingham and Wilton. The third refinery was developed in 1968 by Shell Oil on the south shore within Teesport. This facility was served by what became known as Tees Dock, with the whole docks facility designed around Panamax scale ships. In 1980, with the discovery of North Sea gas, a 220 miles (350 km) pipeline was installed between Ekofisk and Seal Sands on the north shore. Although the Shell refinery was mothballed in 1989 and later closed, and the north shore facility of Petroplus closed in 2010, as a result of the pipeline petrochemicals traffic still today represents about 50% of the cargo through Teesport, around 26 million tonnes a year.

In 1992 the Port Authority of Tees and Hartlepool was privatised, with the original three buyers subsequently reduced to a single owner, Powell Duffryn Plc, in 1995. With traffic out-scaling the port's handling and ship-scale facilities, PD Ports then developed TCT2 in 2002 specifically as a deep-sea cargo quay on top of the site that used to be the original Tees Dock.

In March 2021, Teesport became the UK's largest Freeport.

== See also ==
- Northeast of England Process Industry Cluster (NEPIC)
- Teesside Steelworks
- Tees and Hartlepool Harbour Police
