= Tees and Hartlepool Harbour Police =

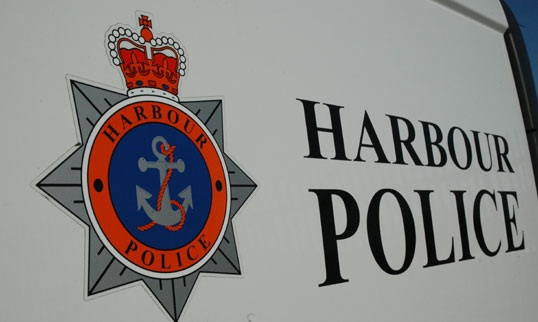
Tees and Hartlepool Harbour police sign.

Tees and Hartlepool Harbour Police are a non-Home Office ports police force responsible for Teesport, which is the UK's third largest port and is owned by PD Ports, situated along the south bank of the River Tees in north east England. The harbour police force is over 100 years old and was originally formed under the Harbour, Docks and Piers Clauses Act 1847.

== Power and authority ==
Although the force was originally formed under the Harbour, Docks and Piers Clauses Act 1847, the current authority derives from Tees and Hartlepool Port Authority Act 1966, with constables' jurisdictions extending to two miles beyond the harbour. Under the Act, the harbour police have ‘all the powers and privileges, and shall be entitled to the indemnities and protection, of a constable within the harbour and in any place not more than two miles beyond the limits of the harbour’.

Any serious or major crime or incidents become the responsibility of the local Home Office police force, Cleveland Police.

== Mission and aim ==
The primary function of the harbour police is the detection and reduction of crime. This is achieved through a combination of high visibility patrols, good local knowledge and good intelligence. The use of closed-circuit television (CCTV) and the use of highly visible personnel promote the prevention of crime by removing criminal opportunities and increasing the risk of criminals being caught.

== Policing strategy ==
The harbour police use CCTV, high-visibility patrols, good knowledge of the area and information from port users and visitors to achieve their mission of detecting and reducing crime within the Tees and Hartlepool port and the immediate surrounding area. Detailed knowledge of the workings of the port means harbour police can control an incident, or event, with little or no impact on the day-to-day running of the port.

== Collaboration ==
Harbour Police exercise all the functions which may be expected of any constable within the jurisdiction and may be involved in many types of crime, assistance to the public, marine incident, traffic violation or assistance to other law enforcement agencies.

Though harbour police have the right to exercise the full powers of constable, there are good arrangements in place with other forces for mutual assistance and collaboration, such as pooling equipment or cooperating in operations and exercises.

Any serious crime or a major incident would be the responsibility of the local territorial police force, Cleveland Police, but the harbour police would provide support and initial response. In addition all persons arrested by the harbour police will be processed at a Cleveland police station.

== Officer training ==
The harbour police officers undergo training as follows:

- in first aid,
- police training such as use of handcuffs and restraints,
- arrest techniques,
- use of a police baton,
- conflict management,
- attend a response driving course with a local county force
- and also qualify as a port facilities security officer.

and other typical aspects of police training.

They will also be expected to keep up with legislation and terrorist threat levels by attending other courses provided to meet these requirements. As well as all aspects of general police duties, the harbour police constable will be involved in many other port and shipping related tasks, including the berthing of vessels and checking various safety and other regulations necessary for the operation of the port. Officers will be expected to visit ships that use the port to issue general directions and byelaws and to check for any dangerous cargo, explosives or firearms carried. They understand the requirements of maritime legislation and they have a very busy and important role to play enforcing the requirements of the International Ships and Ports Facility Security Code. As such, officers are trained and tested on these crucial aspects of the harbour police's role.

== Organisation ==
Like any other police organisation, the harbour police have a management and rank structure. The service is headed by a chief inspector/Head of policing and Security. Currently the senior officers are as follows:

- Chief Officer: Head of Policing & Security Neal Armstrong
- Police Inspector : Mick Jackson
- Sergeant(s): Sergeant Tim Woolven, Steve Coulson
- Police Constables currently 11

=== Rank structure ===
Chief Officer	no insignia
Harbour Police Inspector	Uk-police-03
Harbour Police Sergeant	PS Epaulette
Harbour Police Constable	PC Epaulette

== Vehicles ==
The harbour police maintains a fleet of police vehicles, to assist in its duties to police the port and nearby land. Currently the land fleet consists of, but not limited to:

- Five Skoda Kodiaq Patrol Car's fitted with ANPR
- One Ford Transit Custom Cell Van
- One Peugeot Partner Van

== Equipment ==
The harbour police uses typical police equipment. Every officer is issued with a baton, handcuffs and leg restraints, Uniform consists of black polo tops, as well as a police fleece, high visibility jackets and black peaked, or bowler, cap with cap badge.

== See also ==
- Law enforcement in the United Kingdom
- List of law enforcement agencies in the United Kingdom, Crown Dependencies and British Overseas Territories
- Tees and Hartlepool Port Authority byelaws 1977 & 1985
