= SNF =

SNF may refer to:

== Organizations ==
- National League of Sweden (previously Sveriges Nationella Förbund), youth organisation
- SNF Floerger, polyacrylamide manufacturer
- Somali National Front, a political armed movement
- Stavros Niarchos Foundation, Greek charity
- Swiss National Science Foundation (Schweizerischer Nationalfonds zur Förderung der wissenschaftlichen Forschung)

== Transport ==
- Shenfield railway station (station code SNF), Essex, England
- Sub Teniente Nestor Arias Airport (IATA code: SNF), San Felipe, Yaracuy, Venezuela

== Other uses ==
- ESPN Sunday Night Football, a live game telecast of the NFL on ESPN
- NBC Sunday Night Football, a live game telecast of the NFL on NBC
- Neurotransmitter sodium symporter (symbol: SNF), a family of proteins
- Saturday Night Football (UK TV programme), 2013–2016
- Server Normal Format, a bitmap font format used by X Window
- Skilled nursing facility
- Smith normal form
- Spent nuclear fuel
