= Tyne Renewable Energy Plant =

- Country: England, United Kingdom
- Location: North Shields
- Coordinates: 54.989°N 1.459°W
- Status: Cancelled
- Construction cost: £400 million
- Owner: MGT Power

Thermal power station
- Primary fuel: Biomass

Power generation
- Nameplate capacity: 295 MW

External links
- Website: www.mgttyne.com

Tyne Renewable Energy Plant (or Tyne REP) was a proposed biomass power station, to be built on the north bank of the River Tyne at North Shields. The plant was developed by MGT Power, along with their similar project, the Teesport Renewable Energy Plant on Teesside. It was expected to have a generating capacity of 295 megawatts, enough to power around 600,000 homes, meaning it would have been one of the biggest of its kind in Europe. It was originally hoped the plant would be opened in 2014, costing £400 million.

The plant was planned to be built on a 14 acres (5.7 ha) industrial site at the Port of Tyne in North Shields adjacent to the proposed North Shields Bio Diesel Plant on the north bank of the River Tyne. The construction of the plant was estimated to create around 600 jobs, as well as 150 full-time jobs once the plant was completed, and 300 to 400 indirect jobs in the supply chain. It was expected to have added an annual spend of £30 million in the local economy.

As of 2016, MGT were no longer actively pursuing plans for the plant.

A separate redevelopment project at the Port of Tyne was announced in September 2025 under the name Tyne Clean Energy Park. The £150 million development involves transforming a 230-acre industrial site to support offshore renewable energy, clean energy infrastructure and advanced manufacturing. The proposals include 400 meters of additional deep-water quayside. In July 2026, the UK government announced that the Marine Management Organization would act as the project's Lead Environmental Regulator to coordinate the planning and environmental approval process. The development is separate from the previously proposed Tyne Renewable Energy Plant.
