= Coryton Refinery =

Oil refinery in Essex, England

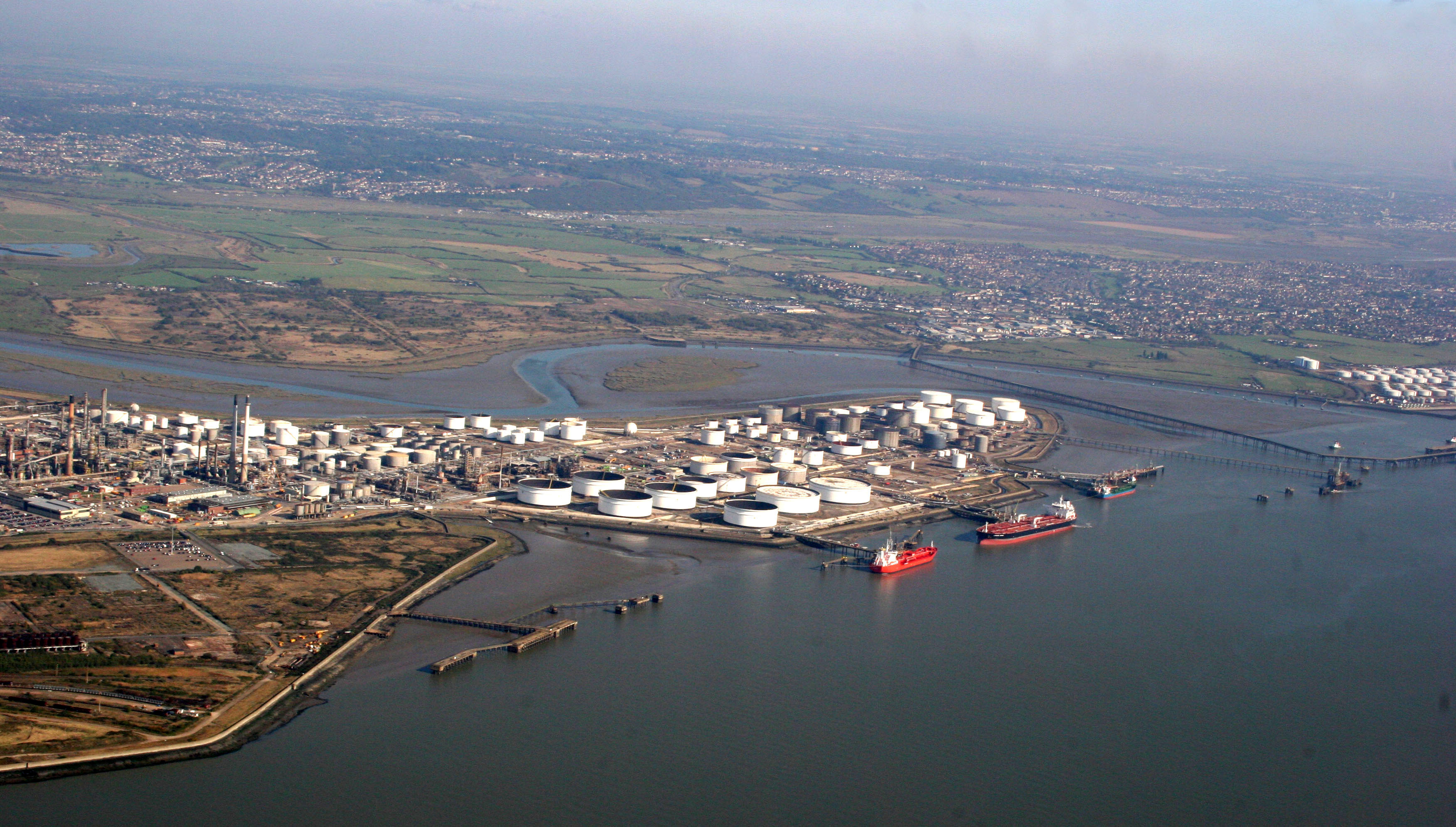

- Location of Coryton Refinery in Essex
- Location: Thurrock, Essex, England, United Kingdom; 51.513°N 0.521°E

Refinery details
- Operator: See owner
- Owners: Socony-Vacuum Corp, Socony Mobil Oil Company, Mobil Oil Corporation, BP, BP Amoco, Petroplus
- Opened: 1953; 73 years ago
- Closed: 2012; 14 years ago
- Capacity: 208,000 barrels per day (33,100 m^{3}/d)
- No. of employees: 1040
- No. of oil tanks: 220

Coryton Refinery was an oil refinery in Essex, England, on the estuary of the River Thames 28 miles (45 km) from central London, between Shell Haven Creek and Hole Haven Creek, which separates Canvey Island from the mainland.

It was a part of the Port of London and was the last of the three major refineries on the Thames Estuary to remain in operation, following closure of Shell Haven and BP Kent. Output was delivered by road, sea and rail, and it was linked to Stanlow Refinery in North West England by the UK Oil Pipeline (UKOP). There is a 753 MW gas-fired power station, opened in 2002 and run by Coryton Energy Co Ltd, part of Intergen.

In January 2012, Petroplus filed for bankruptcy. Coryton Refinery ceased production in June 2012. The site is being turned into an industrial hub to be called Thames Enterprise Park.

== History ==
=== Explosives factory ===
In 1895, the ammunition firm Kynochs built an explosives factory at the site. This opened in 1897, with an estate for employees called Kynochtown. Products included cordite, guncotton, gunpowder, and cartridges. Kynochs also built the Corringham Light Railway (CLR), with a passenger branch from the works to Corringham and a goods branch to the London, Tilbury and Southend Railway at Thames Haven. The Kynoch works closed in 1919.

=== Oil storage depot ===
In 1921, the site and CLR were taken over by coal merchants Cory Brothers Ltd of Cardiff to build an oil storage depot, with Kynochtown renamed Coryton. Sources differ as to whether Corys, who sold a well-known brand of petrol, Corys' Motor Spirit, also built a refinery at the site. Cracknell states that Cory Bros 'turned to the manufacture and distribution of oil products' for which they 'constructed oil storage tanks and a cross-cracking plant'. In 1937, the annual throughput of Coryton refinery was 250,000 tonnes.

=== Refinery ===
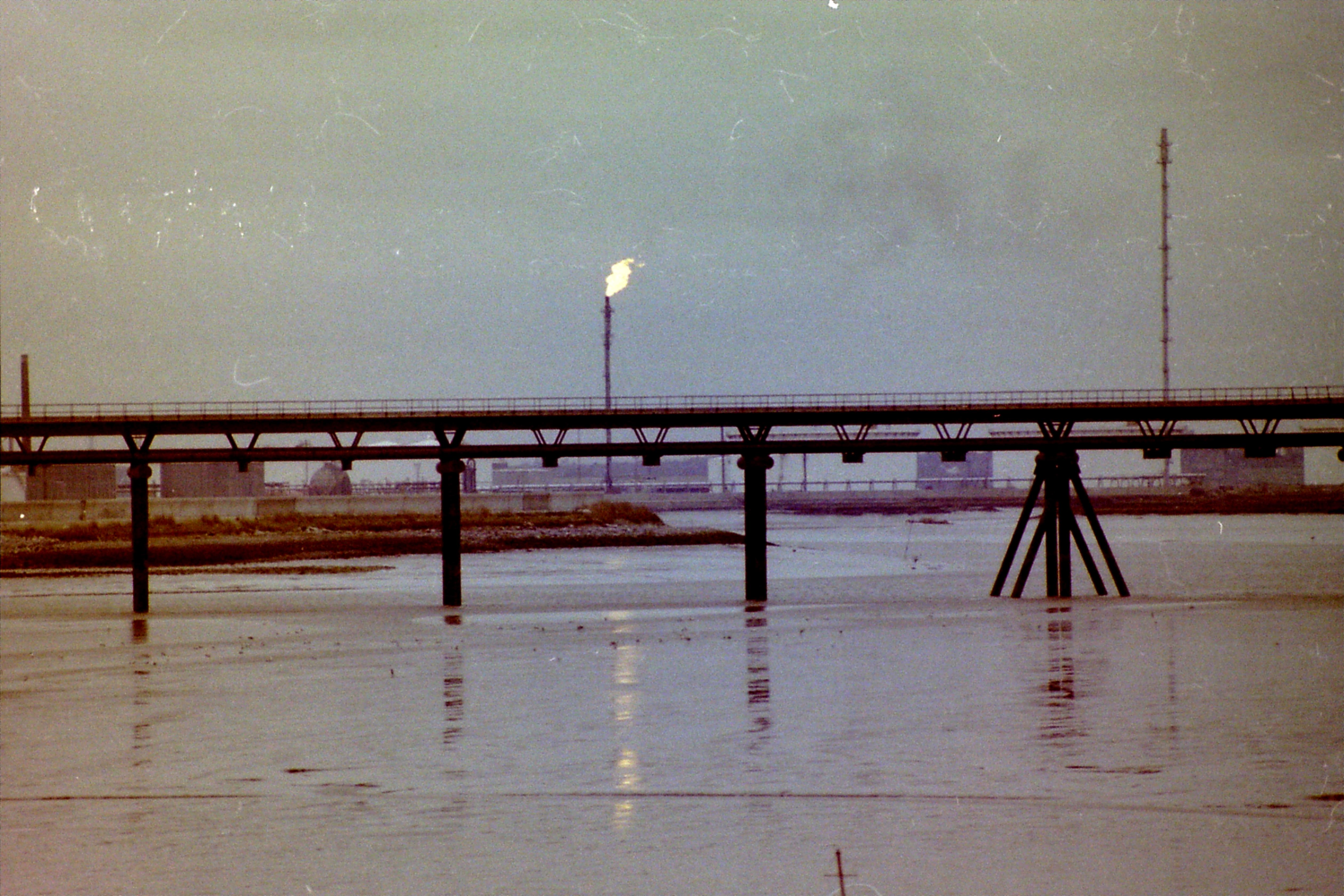
Coryton oil refinery flare stacks and Occidental jetty – Mar 1981

In 1950, Coryton and the CLR were sold to the American Vacuum Oil Company, later Mobil. The CLR to Corringham was closed, but the branch from Thames Haven was upgraded to main-line standards. A new refinery came on stream in 1953. In 1954, the annual throughput of Coryton refinery was 850,000 tonnes. By 1964, the annual throughput of Coryton refinery was 2.4 million tonnes, with a planned extension of a further 0.9 million tonnes. Coryton village was demolished and absorbed into the refinery site in the 1970s. In 1977, work started on an extension to the refinery including a hydrogen fluoride alkylation unit to produce more gasoline. In 1978, about 1.5 million tonnes of oil and refined products were stored in the refinery tank farm, and about 800 people worked on the site. The alkylation unit was commissioned in late 1981 and included a water spray system to dissolve any releases of hydrogen fluoride.

==== BP ====
Coryton was operated by BP from 1996, when Mobil's fuels operations in Europe were placed into a joint venture with BP. In 1996, BP purchased land to the west of the refinery from the neighbouring Shell refinery; the Shell facilities were demolished and the land was proposed for future expansion. Following the merger in 1999 of Mobil with Exxon, the remaining interest in the refinery was sold to BP Amoco in 2000.

==== Petroplus ====
In 2007, the plant was sold by BP to Petroplus for £714.6m (around $1.4 billion).

On 24 January 2012, it was announced that Petroplus had filed for bankruptcy, putting the refinery's future into doubt. To alleviate a possible surge in fuel prices, oil supplies were ordered from other refineries in the UK, such as the Stanlow Refinery via the UK oil pipeline network. Shipments from Coryton resumed on 26 January following agreements signed by the administrators.

===== Fire =====
A major fire occurred on 31 October 2007. Despite the scale of the blast, which was reported to cause buildings to shake 14 miles (23 km) away, there were no physical injuries and only partial disruption to the refinery.

==== Shutdown ====
PwC (Administration)

On 28 May 2012, it was announced that the refinery would close due to PricewaterhouseCoopers, the administrators, having failed to find a buyer. Igor Yusufov's Energy Investment Fund was the only potential bidder ready to keep the refinery operating. On 28 February 2013, the gas supply to the site was shut off. Around twelve hours later the flare went out, bringing to an end over 60 years of operations at the refinery.

=== Deepwater fuel import terminal ===
In 2012 the refinery was planned to be turned into a diesel import terminal by Vopak, Shell and Greenergy, with an initial capacity of 500,000 cubic metres (18,000,000 cu ft). In 2014 the partners delayed the project to consider options, as the existing plant was in a poorer condition than expected.

=== Coryton Power Station ===
Coryton Power Station was commissioned on part of the site in 2002, and continues to operate.

== Process units ==
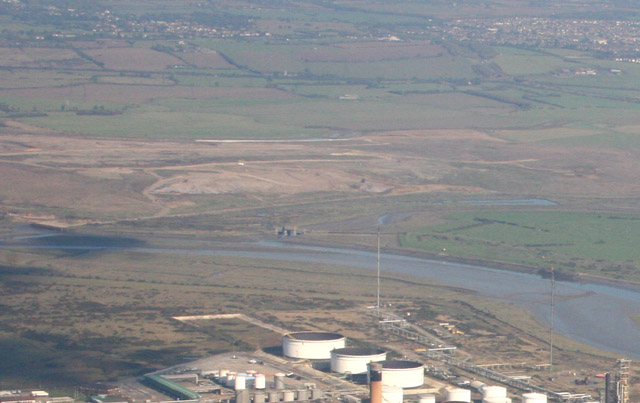
Coryton flare stack in 2007

Their main operating units were:

- Crude oil distillation unit (CDU)
- Vacuum distillation
- Fluid catalytic cracker
- Catalytic reformer
- Hydro desulphurisation units
- Gas recovery unit
- Isomerisation unit
- Alkylation unit

The thermal reformer unit and the Thermofor catalytic cracking unit (TCC) produced different grades of petrol and diesel. Along the south side of the refinery area, the propane de-asphalting unit, solvent refining furfural unit, MEK (methyl ethyl ketone) dewaxing unit and continuous percolation unit (TCP) constituted consecutive stages in the production of lubricating oils and waxes.

== Statistics ==
The Coryton refinery site covered an area of 370 acres (150 ha). The main processing units were to the western end of the site, with the tank farm occupying the north and eastern part of the site.

Crude oil was received from tankers of up to 250,000 tonnes deadweight (DWT). There were five jetties on the Thames, the most easterly extended into the deep water channel. In 2005, BP acquired a fleet of three new 32 m tugs for towing, mooring, fire-fighting and pollution control at the plant. They were named 'Corringham', 'Stanford', and 'Castle Point' after nearby locations.

The maximum refining capacity was 11 million tonnes per year or 208,000 bbl/day.

In 2000, the principal sources of crude oil for refining at Coryton were: North Sea (60%); Middle East (20%); Africa/Mediterranean (10%); and Russia (10%).

There were about 220 storage tanks on the site, the largest were the floating-roof crude oil storage tanks each with a capacity of 80,000 tonnes.

Cooling water for the refinery was taken from the Thames. After use, the water was treated and discharged into Hole Haven Creek. A moat around the site collects run-off, this was taken to the water treatment plant and was oxygenated prior to discharge into the Thames.

Product output:

- petrol 3.6 million tonnes (One source states that in 2000 Coryton produced 13 million litres of gasoline each day.)
- diesel 2.7 million tonnes
- kerosene/jet fuel 1.1 million tonnes
- LPG 0.2 million tonnes
- Fuel oil 1.7 million tonnes
- Bitumen 0.3 million tonnes

The principal product from the refinery were fuels (90.5%), comprising:

- Liquefied Petroleum Gases 2.5%
- Gasoline 40.0%
- Diesel 23.0%
- Fuel Oil 15.0%
- Kerosene 10.0%

About 5.0% of the fuel was used on site for the refinery processes.

Non-fuels comprised 4.0% of the production comprising Lubricants, Bitumen and Wax.

About 40% of the production from Coryton was exported abroad by ship. The majority (60%) was distributed around the UK by pipeline, road tanker, rail or coastal shipping.

== In popular culture ==
=== Music ===
The refinery served as an inspiration for the 1970s Essex pub rock movement, particularly the band Dr. Feelgood. Guitarist Wilko Johnson cited the refinery's towers and gas flares as a songwriting influence. The opening line of the track "All Through the City" from their 1975 debut album directly references the site: "Stand and watch the towers burning at the break of day." Early promotional photographs for the band featured the refinery as a backdrop.

=== Film and television ===
Following its shutdown and partial decommissioning, the site was repurposed as an exterior filming location. The BBC series Silent Witness filmed at the refinery in September 2014. Production took place for the first season of the Star Wars series Andor at the site in April 2021, The refinery was used to represent various alien industrial environments, serving as backdrops for locations on the planets Ferrix and Morlana One. The refinery was featured in the DC film The Batman (2022) during the Batmobile chase scene.
