= Clugston =

Clugston is a surname. Notable people with the surname include:

- Beatrice Clugston (1827–1888), Scottish philanthropist
- Chynna Clugston Flores (born 1975), American comic book creator
- Kate Clugston (1892–1985), playwright, poet and teacher
- Kathy Clugston (born 1969), Northern Irish newsreader and continuity announcer
- Lin Clugston, (1908–1993), British amateur cricketer

== Other uses ==
- Clugston Group, a British company
