= Andrézieux-Bouthéon =

Andrézieux-Bouthéon Andrèsiô-Botion (Arpitan)
- Commune
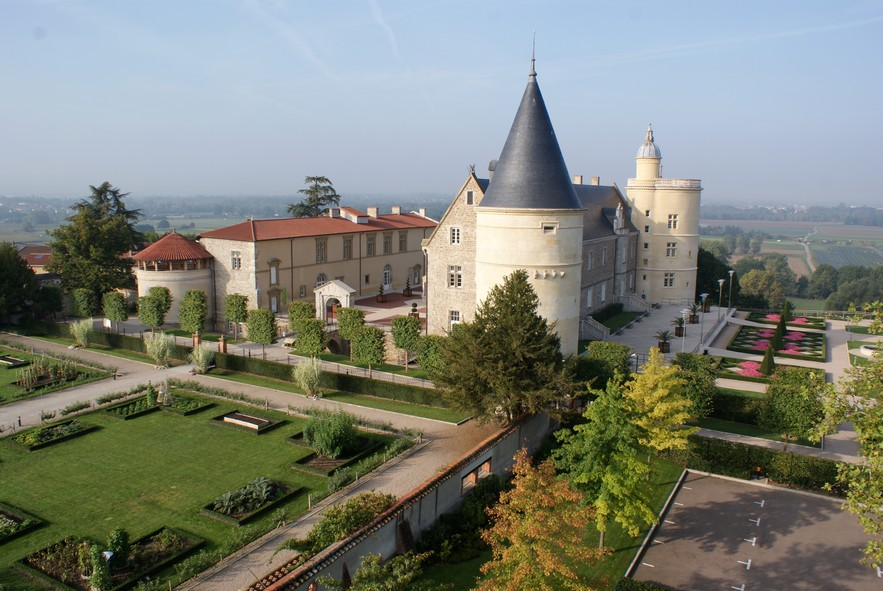
- Château of Bouthéon

- Coat of arms
- Location of Andrézieux-Bouthéon
- Location within France Location within Auvergne-Rhône-Alpes
- Coordinates: 45°31′37″N 4°15′39″E
- Country: France
- Region: Auvergne-Rhône-Alpes
- Department: Loire
- Arrondissement: Saint-Étienne
- Canton: Andrézieux-Bouthéon
- Intercommunality: Saint-Étienne Métropole

Government
  - Mayor (2020–2026): François Driol
- Area^{1}: 16.28 km^{2} (6.29 sq mi)
- Elevation: 367 m (1,204 ft)
- Highest elevation: 435 m (1,427 ft)
- Lowest elevation: 353 m (1,158 ft)
- Population (2023): 10,425
  - Density: 640.4/km^{2} (1,659/sq mi)
- Time zone: UTC+01:00 (CET)
  - Summer (DST): UTC+02:00 (CEST)
- INSEE/Postal code: 42005 /42160
- ^{1} French Land Register data, which excludes lakes, ponds, glaciers > 1 km^{2} (0.386 sq mi or 247 acres) and river estuaries.

Andrézieux-Bouthéon (French pronunciation: [ɑ̃dʁezjø buteɔ̃]; Arpitan: Andrèsiô-Botion [ã.dre.ˈzjø bu.ˈtsjũ]) is a commune of the Loire department, France. It lies on the right bank of the river Loire, at its confluence with the river Furan, 13 km north of the city of Saint-Étienne. Saint-Étienne-Loire Airport is situated 1.5 km south of the town.

== Population ==
Historical population
Year	Pop.	±% p.a.
1968	3,952	—
1975	7,640	+9.87%
1982	8,877	+2.17%
1990	9,407	+0.73%
1999	9,153	−0.30%
2007	9,549	+0.53%
2012	9,788	+0.50%
2017	9,790	+0.00%
2023	10,425	+1.05%
Source: INSEE

== Sights ==
- Le Château Bouthéon

== Local Businesses ==
As of 31 December 2014, Andrézieux-Bouthéon was home to 1,321 establishments : 6 in agriculture, forestry and fishing, 119 in industry, 174 in construction, 864 in trade, transport and various services and 158 related to public administration, education, health and social services..

In 2015 alone, 94 businesses were established in Andrézieux-Bouthéon, 55 of them coming from self-employed entrepreneurs.

Among the 32 companies generating annual revenue exceeding €10 million (excluding hypermarkets), the following can be cited:

- SNF Floerger, global manufacturer of polyacrylamides;
- ZF Bouthéon, a production site of ZF Friedrichshafen, one of the world's leading suppliers of driveline and chassis technologies;
- HEF Group, an international company specializing in surface engineering;
- Setelen : an electrical networks and telecommunications company acquired by Scopelec Revel in 2010;
- Thermal, a manufacturer of high-temperature insulation wool for industrial applications;
- SPCM, a producer of polyacrylamides used in drinking water production, wastewater treatment, enhanced oil recovery, mining, paper manufacturing, agriculture, textiles and cosmetics;
- Bennes Marrel, a manufacturer of metal skip and container systems;
- Outillage de Saint-Étienne, a distributor of industrial tools through a travelling sales network;
- Cartonnerie de l'Ondaine, a corrugated cardboard manufacturer;
- JDE Peet’s, operating a coffee roasting and packaging plant.

== International Relations ==
Andrézieux is twinned with:

- Neu-Isenburg, Germany
- Maia, Portugal
- Soham, England
- (Italy) Chiusi, Italia

== See also ==
- Saint-Étienne - Bouthéon Airport
- ASF Andrézieux
- Communes of the Loire department
