= Thomas Powell (mine owner) =

Welsh entrepreneur

- Born: 6 January 1779; Monmouth, Wales
- Died: 24 March 1863 (aged 84); Newport, Wales
- Occupation: Coal mine owner
- Years active: 1829–1863

Thomas Powell (1779–1863) was a Welsh coal mine owner who between 1829 and his death became one of the most successful. By 1862 he owned 16 mines which together produced over 700,000 tons of coal, making them some of the richest sources in the world. His company has now evolved into PD Ports.
