= Petroplus =

Petroplus AG
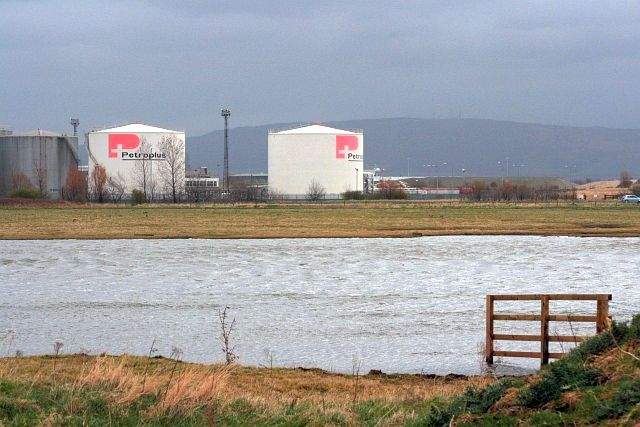
- Type: Public
- Traded as: SIX: PPHN
- Industry: Oil and gas
- Founded: 1993
- Defunct: 2012
- Headquarters: Zug, Switzerland
- Key people: Thomas D. O'Malley, CEO; Karyn F. Ovelmen, CFO
- Products: Petroleum; Natural gas Motor fuels Aviation fuels
- Services: Service stations
- Revenue: ▲US$20 billion (2010)
- Number of employees: 1,750
- Website: petroplusholdings.com (defunct)

Petroplus Holdings AG was Europe's largest independent oil refiner by capacity. When it was first formed in 1993, it was known as Petroplus International N.V., and was based in the Netherlands. In August 1998, it was listed on the Amsterdam Stock Exchange. In April 2005, it was delisted from the Euronext Amsterdam stock exchange when the company was acquired by a holding company. In November 2006, the company went public on the Swiss Stock Exchange.

== Acquisitions ==
In 1997, it acquired the Antwerp N.V. Refinery from the Daewoo Group.

In May 2000, it bought the Cressier Refinery, in Cressier, Switzerland from Shell Switzerland. In December 2000, it bought the Teesside Refinery in Port Clarence from Phillips Petroleum Company.

In May 2006, it bought the BRC Antwerp Refinery for $511m from Sovereign Holding Ltd (Bermuda).

In March 2007, it bought the Ingolstadt Refinery from ExxonMobil for $425m. In June 2007, it bought the Coryton Refinery near London from BP for $1.4bn.

In April 2008, it bought the Petit Couronne Refinery and Reichstett Refinery, located in France from Shell for $785m.

== Financial problems ==
In December 2011 a $1bn credit line to the company was frozen by its bank lenders. The company was planning to shut down some refineries if negotiations to restore the credit failed. The chief executive said they would do all they could to avoid bankruptcy. On 24 January 2012, Petroplus announced that they were filing for insolvency after it defaulted on $1.75bn of senior notes and convertible bonds.

== Former refineries ==
- Antwerp N.V. Refinery (Belgium) sold to VTTI and renamed Antwerp Terminal & Processing Company (ATPC)
- BRC Antwerp Refinery (Belgium) sold to Gunvor Group
- Coryton Refinery (UK) closed
- Cressier Refinery (Switzerland) sold to Varo Energy
- Ingolstadt Refinery (Germany) sold to Gunvor Group
- Petit Couronne Refinery (France) closed
- Reichstett Refinery (France) closed
- Teesside Refinery (UK) closed
