= Tees Renewable Energy Plant =

Proposed biomass power station in England

- Official name: Tees Renewable Energy Plant
- Country: England, United Kingdom
- Location: North Yorkshire, North East England
- Coordinates: 54.5975°N 1.1703°W
- Status: Proposed
- Commission date: 2020 (expected)
- Construction cost: £650 million
- Owner: MGT Teesside

Thermal power station
- Primary fuel: Biomass

Power generation
- Nameplate capacity: 299 MW

External links
- Website: www.mgtteesside.co.uk

Tees Renewable Energy Plant is a proposed biomass fueled power station situated on the River Tees at Teesport in Redcar and Cleveland, North East England. The plant will operate alongside other renewable energy units and industrial processes operating in the Northeast of England Process Industry Cluster (NEPIC)

== Development ==
The station would burn 1,100,000 tonnes (1,200,000 tons) of woodpellets per year, sustainably sourced and primarily imported from Europe and America. This would generate 299 megawatts of electricity, enough to power 600,000 homes. If constructed the plant would be one of the largest dedicated wood pellet biomass power station in the United Kingdom, and one of the largest ever biomass-fueled power stations in the world. It is expected to save 1.2 million tonnes of carbon dioxide per year, accounting for 5.5% of the UK's renewables target.

Redcar and Cleveland borough council approved the scheme in November 2008, before the government gave their consent in July 2009. The station is expected to cost £650 million to construct, employing 600 people during its three-year construction period. The station is planned to be opened for commercial operation in 2020.

MGT sold the plant to Macquarie Group and Danish pension fund PKA in 2016, and construction started, with expected completion in 2020.

At 299 MW this is the world's biggest purpose-built biomass power station. It burns up to 1.5 million tonnes of pellets per year, made from around 3 million tonnes of green wood: wood that has been recently cut and therefore has not had an opportunity to dry by evaporation of the internal moisture. Wood is sourced from the USA.

== See also ==
- Northeast of England Process Industry Cluster (NEPIC)
