= PD Ports =

Shipping and logistics company in the UK

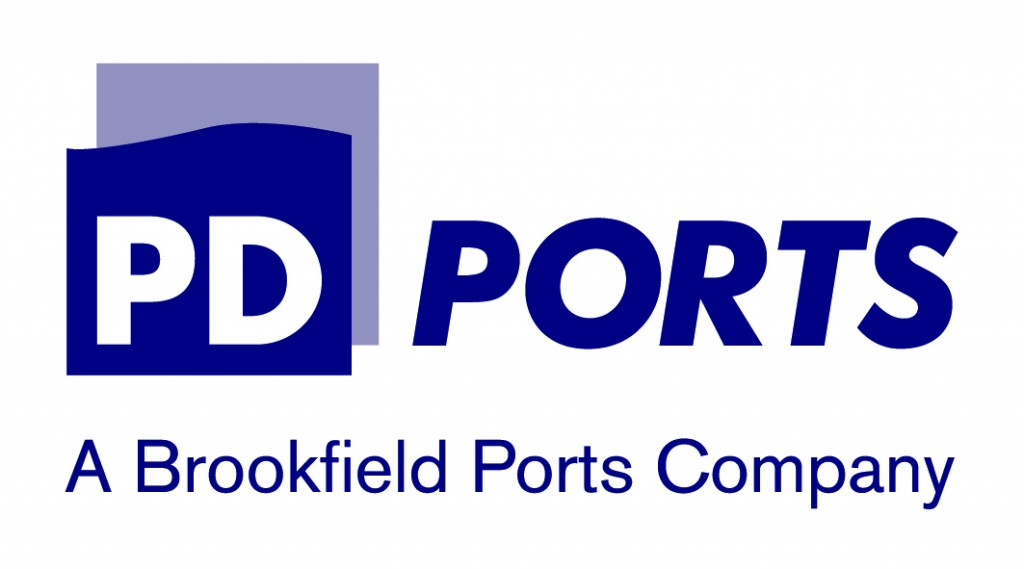
- Type: Private company
- Industry: Ports
- Predecessor: Powell Duffryn
- Founded: 1840, Aberdare, South Wales
- Founder: Thomas Powell
- Headquarters: Middlesbrough, England
- Number of locations: Teesport, Hartlepool
- Owner: Brookfield Asset Management
- Website: www.pdports.co.uk

PD Ports is a Middlesbrough, England headquartered port, shipping and logistics company; owner of Teesport, and ports at Hartlepool, Howden and Keadby; with additional operations at the Felixstowe, Immingham and Hull.

Formerly known as Powell Duffryn, it traces its origins to a coal mining company founded by Thomas Powell in the 19th century in the South Wales coalfield. After Thomas Powell's death in 1863 the company operated as the Powell Duffryn Steam Coal Company having been amalgamated into the business of Sir George Elliot. During the latter part of the 19th and early 20th centuries, the company expanded its mining activities, also acquiring shipping firm Stephenson Clarke in 1928. After number of colliery acquisitions and a merger with the Welsh Associated Collieries in 1935 it became Powell Duffryn Associated Collieries In 1947 the main coal mining division of the business was nationalised into the National Coal Board. The remainder of the company diversified, mainly into shipping and engineering, and acquired the ports of Tees and Hartlepool in the 1990s. Restructuring in the late 1990s/early 2000s resulted in the sale of engineering businesses and a focus on port operations.

The company was acquired in 2000 by Nikko Principal Investments, a subsidiary of Nikko Cordial of Japan. In 2003 the company re-branded as PD Ports. In 2005 the company was acquired by infrastructure division of Babcock & Brown, and then sold to Brookfield Asset Management in 2009.

== History ==
=== Foundation – Thomas Powell (1779?–1863) ===
The business started in Newport, Wales in the late 18th century as by Thomas Powell who had inherited the family business at the age of 14 on his father's death – in 1810 Powell acquired land in Llanhilleth and began coal mining.

Powell expanded his coal business, opening several collieries in the Newport area – by 1830 Powell's business had become successful – aided by the increasing demand for coal in steam engines; good transport connections via the River Severn and canal system, and later by the railways; and by the high quality of the Welsh coal. Removal of a coal export tax in the 1830s allowed Powell to more widely export the coal, and compete for the market in northern England. The company's first deep mine was sunk at Cwmbach, Aberdare in 1840, opening further mines in both Aberdare and the Rhymney Valley in the following decades. Together with Thomas Prothero and John Latch he formed the first South Wales coal syndicate in 1833, the "Newport Coal Association".

From the 1830s Powell began assembling his own shipping fleet, and also invested £20,000 in the Taff Vale Railway. By the 1840s Powell's mining interests were the amongst the world's largest coal producers. Powell's Duffryn was one of Thomas Powell's companies (Dyffrn meaning literally "Valley").

Powell's mine conditions were poor, leading to a number of explosions in the 1850s. In 1858 Powell cut wages by 15% resulting in strikes which were met with strike breaking methods; Strikebreaker labour was introduced from England.

By 1862 Powell controlled 16 mines, which exported more than 700,000 tons of coal. Shortly before his death he arranged the merger of his business interests with those of Sir George Elliott, forming the Powell Duffryn Steam Coal Company Ltd in 1863 with a capital of £500,000. Powell died 24 March 1863.

=== Powell Duffryn Steam Coal Company Ltd (1863–1935) ===
In 1867 the company acquired the Aberaman Estate from iron master Crawshay Bailey, the land of which held much good quality 'steam coal'. By the 1900s the company had begun generating electricity and utilising it in mining. In 1916, E.M Hann was made a director of the company. After the First World War he drove the development of the company, acquiring all the adjoining collieries (Aberaman, Lletysiencyn, Abernant, Gadlys and Blaengwawr), succeeding in sinking every one of the company's collieries in the Aberdare Valley to the lowest seam. The company started a joint venture in the shipping industry with Stephenson and Clarke in 1920, later acquiring their partners outright by 1928.

The company expanded by acquisition of land and construction of pits, including the Rhymney Iron Company, the Windsor Colliery, collieries from Lewis Morthyr, the Great Western Colliery Company and the Nantgawr Colliery; all acquired in the 1920s.

=== Powell Duffryn Associated Collieries (1935–47) ===
In 1935, Powell Duffryn merged with the Welsh Associated Collieries, who owned 34 collieries, and formed the joint venture company Powell Duffryn Associated Collieries, which had an output of 20 million tons p.a. The merged company included the Cambrian Wagon Works, adding an engineering arm to the business.

During the Second World War the companies' engineering subsidiary expanded in order to fulfill military orders. The 12 colliery Cory Brothers & Co. Ltd was acquired in 1942, forming Powell Duffryn Ltd..

=== Nationalisation, Powell Duffryn (1947–2003) ===
The Coal Industry Nationalisation Act 1946 led to the formation of the National Coal Board, which took over the company's coal business – after a decade of negotiation Powell Duffryn was paid £16 million for the assets.

The firm diversified, expanding its former secondary interests: engineering, fuel distribution and shipping. Additional interests included timber, quarries, and brickmaking. Engineering interests included Powell Duffryn Engineering in Llantrisant and the Powell Duffryn Wagon Company. Hamworthy Engineering was acquired in 1962.

By the 1980s the company was showing good profitability; the Hanson Trust made an unsuccessful takeover attempt in 1984. From the late 1980s onwards the company disposed of its railway, shipping and bulk liquid assets: Stephenson Clarke was sold; the loss making railway engineering division was closed in 1993/4; much of the fuel distribution and storage assets were sold between 1996 and 1998.

In 1998 the ship engineering arm was expanded by the purchase of Kvaerner Ships Equipment (KSE) for £34 million from the Kvaerner shipping group.

In 1992 the Tees and Hartlepool Port Authority (THPA) (see Teesport and Port of Hartlepool) was acquired by Powell Duffryn plc, 3i, and Humberside Holdings Limited in 1992; Powell Duffryn became sole owner in 1995.

The company was acquired in 2000 by Nikko Principal Investments Japan, a subsidiary of Nikko Cordial of Japan, with shareholders accepting 570p per share, a valuation of £507 million.

In the late 1990s/early 2000s the company was restructured; selling multiple business interests; after acquisition in 2000 the company's engineering interests were Hamworthy KSE (marine engineering), Hamworthy Belliss and Morcom (compressors), Hamworthy Combustion, and Geesink (waste disposal equipment), representing 2500 of a total workforce of 4,200; the engineering division had higher turnover, but lower profit than the port business.

The Hamworthy Belliss & Morcom compressor division (see Belliss & Morcom) was sold to Gardner Denver Inc. of the United States for £26 million.

== PD Ports (2003–) ==
The company's maritime and port businesses was rebranded in 2003 as PD Ports, Logistics and Shipping (PDPLS).

In 2004 the company was sold to stockbrokers Collins Stewart for £450 million (£170 equity, £280 million debt), followed by an immediate stock market flotation. A bid by Babcock & Brown Infrastructure (BBI) at 150p per share, with total value £337 million was recommended in December 2005. In November 2009, Brookfield Asset Management acquired 100% of PD Ports. from BBI for a nominal $1, taking on $113 million of debt, as part of BBI port asset sales to reduce the company's debt burdens.

== Operations ==
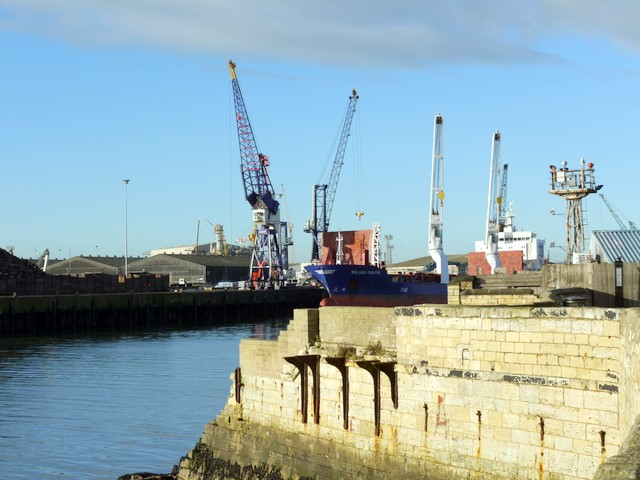
Hartlepool

As of 2013 PD Ports owns and operates the Ports of Tees and Hartlepool under the name Teesport. The company also operates the Hull Container Terminal at the Port of Hull, and provides stevedoring and warehousing services at the Port of Immingham; logistics and warehousing at the Port of Felixstowe, Scunthorpe, and Billingham; and operates a wharf on the Isle of Wight. The company also owns the short sea ports in Scunthorpe (Groveport), Howden (Howdendyke, River Ouse, Yorkshire), and Keadby (River Trent).
