= Lin Clugston =

Irish cricketer

Personal information
- Full name: David Lindsay Clugston
- Born: 5 February 1908; Belfast, Ireland
- Died: 27 September 1993 (aged 85); Birmingham, Warwickshire, England
- Batting: Left-handed
- Bowling: Slow left-arm orthodox

Domestic team information
- Years: Team
- 1928–1946: Warwickshire

Career statistics
Competition	First-class
Matches	6
Runs scored	64
Batting average	7.11
100s/50s	–/–
Top score	17
Balls bowled	660
Wickets	4
Bowling average	118.75
5 wickets in innings	–
10 wickets in match	–
Best bowling	2/75
Catches/stumpings	3/–
- Source: Cricinfo, 18 November 2023

David Lindsay "Lin" Clugston (5 February 1908 – 27 September 1993) was an Irish amateur cricketer who played in six first-class cricket matches for Warwickshire, three of them in 1928 and the other three in 1946. He was born in Belfast and died in Birmingham.

As a cricketer, Clugston was a lower-order left-handed batsman and slow left-arm orthodox spin bowler. He had little success in either of his two forays into first-class cricket: as a batsman, his highest score was just 17 and as a bowler he took only four wickets across six games. He was prominent in Midlands club cricket for many years and played for The Forty Club, which takes cricket into schools, into his 60s. At Edgbaston Cricket Ground, he was for many years to 1988 the "stentorian-voiced" public address announcer: Wisden Cricketers' Almanack noted, in its obituary of him in 1994, that he "would upbraid small boys for the slightest mischief in an echoing basso profundo", and that "his successor is still sometimes called the Cluggie".
