= Wilton International =

Coordinates: 54.5877°N 1.1176°W

- Industrial area
- Location within the United Kingdom
- Unitary authority: Redcar and Cleveland
- Ceremonial county: North Yorkshire
- Country: England
- Sovereign state: United Kingdom

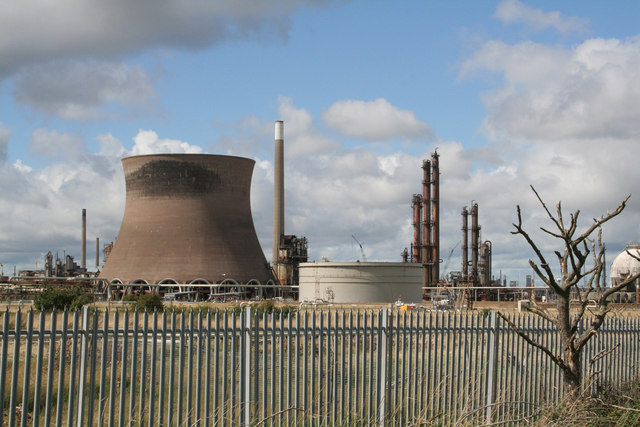
Part of Wilton International, 2006

Wilton International is a multi-occupancy industrial area between Eston and Redcar, North Yorkshire, England. Originally a chemical plant, it has businesses in a variety of fields including energy generation, plastic recycling and process research. It is named after a village to the south of the area.

== History and occupants ==
The site was formerly wholly owned and operated by ICI, a large chemical company which opened the site in 1949.

Following the fragmentation of ICI, the owner of the site since 1995, Enron owned the facility briefly before it was acquired by Sembcorp Industries, a Singapore company. A number of multinational chemical companies now operate on the site. Sembcorp have built the UK's first wood-fired power station, Wilton 10, and in 2013 announced a new waste-to-energy plant known as Wilton 11.

There have been both closures and new chemical plants built at the Wilton site as the process industry continues to change and rejuvenate in line with changing consumer demands.

In 2001, BP closed its polythene plant (Polythene 5), which it had bought from ICI in 1982. In the same year Basell closed its polypropylene plant. In January 2009, Invista announced it was to close all of its plants on the site. The Teesside Power Station, a partially mothballed gas-fired power station built in 1993 for Enron, was being dismantled in 2014 and 2015. A 4 GWh / 1 GW grid battery is scheduled to handle shore power for the ships by 2028.

Lotte Chemicals stopped PTA production, however built a new PET production plant. Huntsman manufacture polyurethane intermediates and Ensus built their bioethanol facility in 2009, which at the time was the largest of its type in the United Kingdom. Biffa Polymers opened a polymer recycling plant that handles up to 30% of the UK's plastic milk bottles in March 2011. UK Wood Recycling Limited have a facility on the site providing waste wood to fuel the Wilton 10 power station.

Wilton International is a multi-occupancy business and research centre and is one of the main offices used by the economic cluster body the Northeast of England Process Industry Cluster (NEPIC). Many occupants of the Wilton International facility are members of the Cluster. The complex is one of the largest R&D facilities in Europe and is home to the Centre for Process Innovation (CPI), part of the Technology Strategy Board's High Value Manufacturing Catapult network. The site has laboratories and scale-up facilities for the chemistry-using process industries, that are accessed by many companies on a commercial or contract basis.
