= SNF Floerger =

French chemical company

SNF
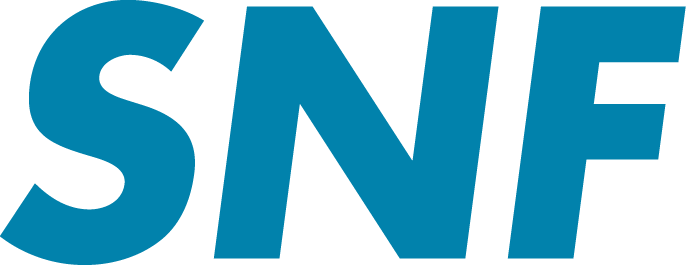
- Type: Private
- Founded: 1978
- Headquarters: Andrézieux, France
- Area served: Worldwide
- Key people: Pascal Remy (Chairman & CEO)
- Website: snf.com

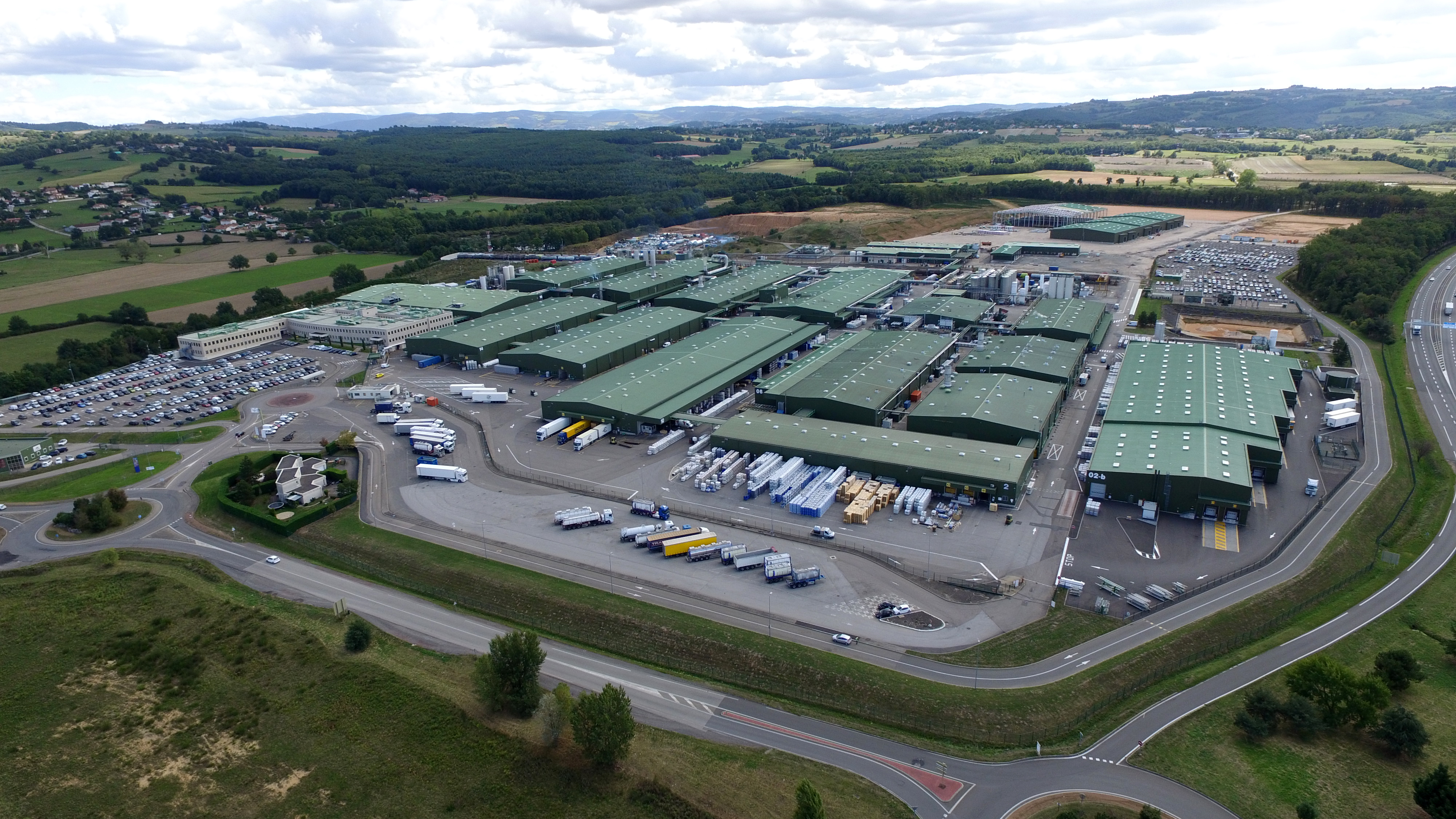
SNF Factory, Andrézieux, France

SNF is an international chemical group specializing in the production of polyacrylamides, water-soluble polymers designed to treat, preserve, and recycle water. Founded in 1978, the company is headquartered in Andrézieux-Bouthéon, France.

SNF is one of the leading global producers of polyacrylamides, which are widely used in water treatment, industrial processes, and resource management.

== History ==
SNF was founded in 1978 by René Pich and Hubert Issaurat following a management buyout of the Floerger business from the American group W.R. Grace.

Starting with about 25 people, the company followed a long-term strategy focused on reinvesting in production capacity and expanding internationally.

During the 1980s and 1990s, SNF expanded internationally by establishing subsidiaries, joint ventures, and production facilities across Europe, North America, Asia, and Latin America.

The group strengthened its industrial base through investments in large-scale production sites and long-term contracts in water treatment and enhanced oil recovery.

Since 2010, under the leadership of Pascal Remy, SNF has continued to expand its global footprint and production capacity.

== Operations ==
SNF manufactures polyacrylamides used in applications where water management is critical. These polymers are primarily used to improve solid–liquid separation processes, enhance industrial efficiency, and support water recycling.

Its main areas of application include:

- Water treatment (municipal and industrial)
- Oil and gas
- Mining
- Pulp and paper
- Agriculture
- Textiles
- Construction
- Personal care

== Global presence ==
SNF operates in approximately 60 countries and has 23 production sites worldwide.

== Financials ==
According to company disclosures, SNF reported revenues of approximately €4.6 billion in 2025 and employed around 9,400 people worldwide.

== Management ==
The company is led by Pascal Remy, Chief Executive Officer.

== Ownership ==
SNF is a privately held company.

1. "Loire. Le leader mondial SNF va encore investir 70 millions d'euros sur son site d'Andrézieux". www.leprogres.fr (in French). 2024-03-19.
2. "SNF va investir plus d'1 Mrd € dans la production de polyacrylamides". L'Usine Nouvelle (in French). 2019-08-26.
3. "Treating the World's Water". SNF.
4. "SNF va investir 450 millions d'euros en 2024 dans son outil de production - Le Journal des Entreprises". www.lejournaldesentreprises.com (in French). 2024-03-20.
5. "Treating the World's Water". SNF.
