= Greenergy =

British distributor and blender of petrol, diesel and jetfuel

Greenergy International Ltd.
- Company type: Private. Limited company
- Industry: Fuel distribution
- Founded: 1992
- Headquarters: 198 High Holborn, London
- Area served: United Kingdom, Ireland, Canada and Brazil
- Key people: Andrew Owens, Chief executive
- Revenue: ▼£15.92 billion (2019); US$21.1 billion
- Operating income: ▲£76.8 million (2019)
- Net income: ▲£43.12 million (2019)
- Total assets: ▲£2.408 billion (2019)
- Number of employees: 1,130 (2019)
- Subsidiaries: Inver Energy
- Website: www.greenergy.com

Greenergy International Ltd is a British distributor of petrol and diesel for motor vehicles and at one point had over a quarter of the UK market. It blends fuels at terminals on the Thames estuary in the south and on Teesside in the north. It sold more than 20 million litres of petrol and diesel a day in 2007. In 2015 it ranked 474 on the Fortune 500 list of largest companies by revenue.

== History ==
Greenergy acquired the growing nationwide dealer network Inver Energy Ltd, headquartered in Cork, Ireland, for an undisclosed amount in early 2017. Through partnership with East Cork Oil and Atlantic Fuel Supply, the deal included Greenergy's co-owned refinery in Foynes, which was the largest refinery in Ireland at 82,000 m3. It acquired a refinery from Texaco in Cardiff from 2006, acquiring 100% of the facility and expanding it in 2010.

Inver Energy had started as local oil and fuel distributor, expanded into marine fuels when it acquired that business from Maxol.

In 2016, Inver Energy recorded a €5.7 million pre-tax profit last year on turnover of €485.9 million, employing 25 people, providing around 10% of Ireland's marine fuel needs.

In March 2024, Trafigura agreed to acquire Greenergy's European business from Brookfield Asset Management and Brookfield Business Partners. At that time, Greenergy had manufacturing plants in the UK and the Netherlands. Trafigura increased its stake in May 2024.

== Operations ==
Greenergy sells fuel to petrol stations and supermarkets for retail sale, and to transport companies in the UK. It does so in Ireland as Inver as of 2015.

The company produces and sells biofuel. It has a 250,000 tonne/300 million litre per year plant at Immingham on the east coast of England where biodiesel is made from rapeseed oil.
