= Trevose Head Lighthouse =

Lighthouse on the north coast of Cornwall, England

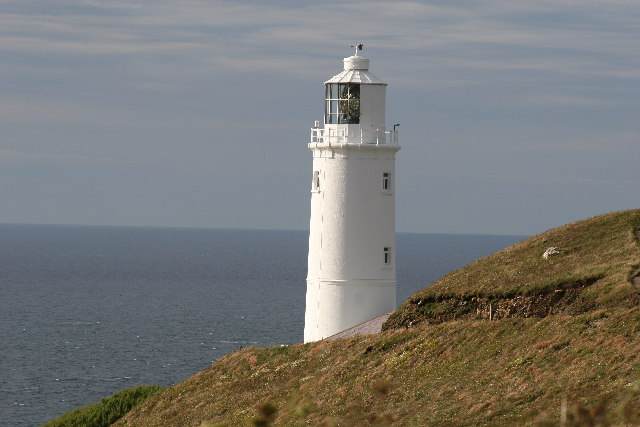
- Trevose Head Lighthouse
- Location: Trevose Head; Cornwall; England
- OS grid: SW8507876563
- Coordinates: 50.549246°N 5.035173°W

Tower
- Constructed: 1847
- Built by: James Walker
- Construction: masonry tower
- Automated: 1995
- Height: 27 m (89 ft)
- Shape: cylindrical tower with balcony and lantern attached to the keeper's house
- Markings: white tower and lantern
- Operator: Rural Retreats
- Heritage: Grade II listed building
- Fog signal: 2 blasts every 30s.

Light
- First lit: 1 December 1847
- Focal height: 62 m (203 ft)
- Lens: 1st order fixed catadioptric (1847-1912); 1st order rotating 3-panel catadioptric (1912-2023)
- Light source: LED lantern (2024-)
- Intensity: 279,000 candela
- Range: 18 nmi (33 km; 21 mi)
- Characteristic: Fl W 7.5s.

Listed Building – Grade II
- Official name: Trevose Lighthouse
- Designated: 20 May 1988
- Reference no.: 1212769

Trevose Head Lighthouse is a lighthouse on Trevose Head on the north Cornish coast at grid reference SW850766 lying to the WSW of Padstow and was sited here as there was previously no light from Land's End to Lundy and it would be visible from Cape Cornwall to Hartland Point.

The tower is 89 feet (27 m) tall, and has a range of 20 nautical miles (37 km; 23 mi), but, on a clear night, it can be seen from Pendeen Lighthouse, over 35 miles (56 km) away.

== History ==
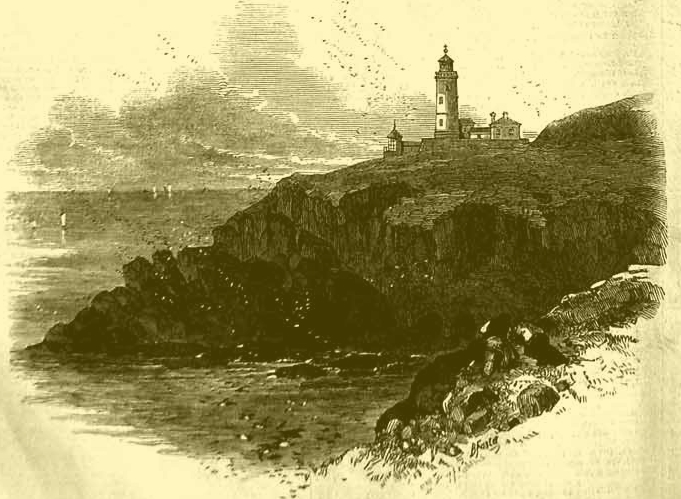
The newly built Trevose Head lighthouse, Cornwall, England showing both 'high' and 'low' lights – from "The Illustrated London News" 1847

=== Construction ===
The site was surveyed by order of the Trinity Board in July 1844 with a design submitted that November and approved February 1845. Building began in that May with the laying out of the road and contract entered into with the builders the next month. During gales on 20–21 November 1846 scaffolding attached to the tower was blown away.

After completion of the first tower, it was determined that the light was under certain circumstances liable to be mistaken by mariners. A second lower light was therefore proposed and (the decision having been taken in June 1847) it was constructed, 50 feet in front of the first light, with a covered passage between them for use by the lighthouse keepers. Only the first built 'high' light now remains.

Designed by engineer James Walker the two original lights, 'high' and 'low', were constructed under the supervision of Henry Norris by builders Jacob & Thomas Olver of Falmouth. They were provided with a pair of first-order fixed optics by Henry Lépaute of Paris and each had an oil lamp with 4 concentric wicks manufactured by Messrs. Wilkins & Co. of Long Acre.

The light was first lit on 1 December 1847.

=== Later developments ===
In 1882, under Engineer-in-Chief James Douglass, the 'high' light was changed to an occulting light, now with a six-wick lamp, and the 'low' light was put out of use. Under the new arrangement the high light was eclipsed (for three seconds) three times in quick succession every minute.

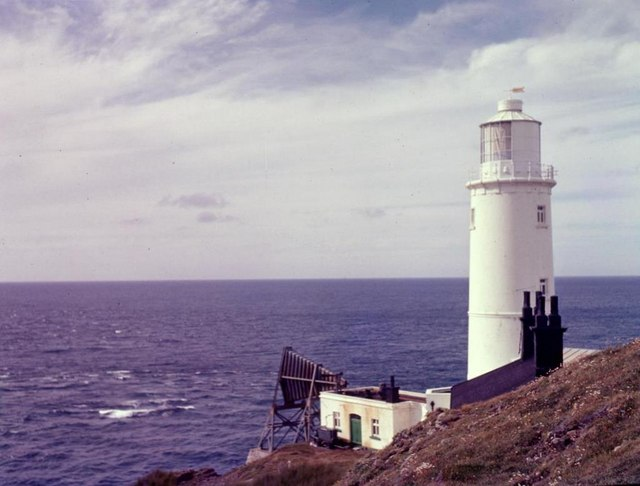
The lighthouse in 1962 (showing the 36-ft long fog horn installed in 1913).

From 1911 a series of further improvements were made. First, the keepers' dwellings were upgraded. Then, in 1912 the light was again updated and a rotating optic (weighing 3.6 tons) was installed, which would remain in service for over a century. At the same time, the addition of a red filter to the lamp meant that (as from 1 August 1912) the lighthouse displayed one short red flash every five seconds.

Work also began on installing a fog signal: a 5-inch siren attached to a 36-foot-long acoustic horn, which came into service in 1913; it was nicknamed 'Lord Rayleigh's trumpet' after its designer, the eminent physicist and acoustician. The trumpet and siren were built on to the roof of a new engine house, containing a pair of Hornsby oil engines, the air compressor, reservoirs and other equipment.

In 1920 a paraffin vapour burner replaced the oil lamp; it continued to show one red flash every 5 seconds.

The fog signal equipment all remained in service until 1963, when the trumpet and siren were replaced by a set of eight 'supertyfon' air horns mounted in a metal turret on top of the engine house. New diesel engines and Reavell compressors were provided. The light was electrified in 1974.

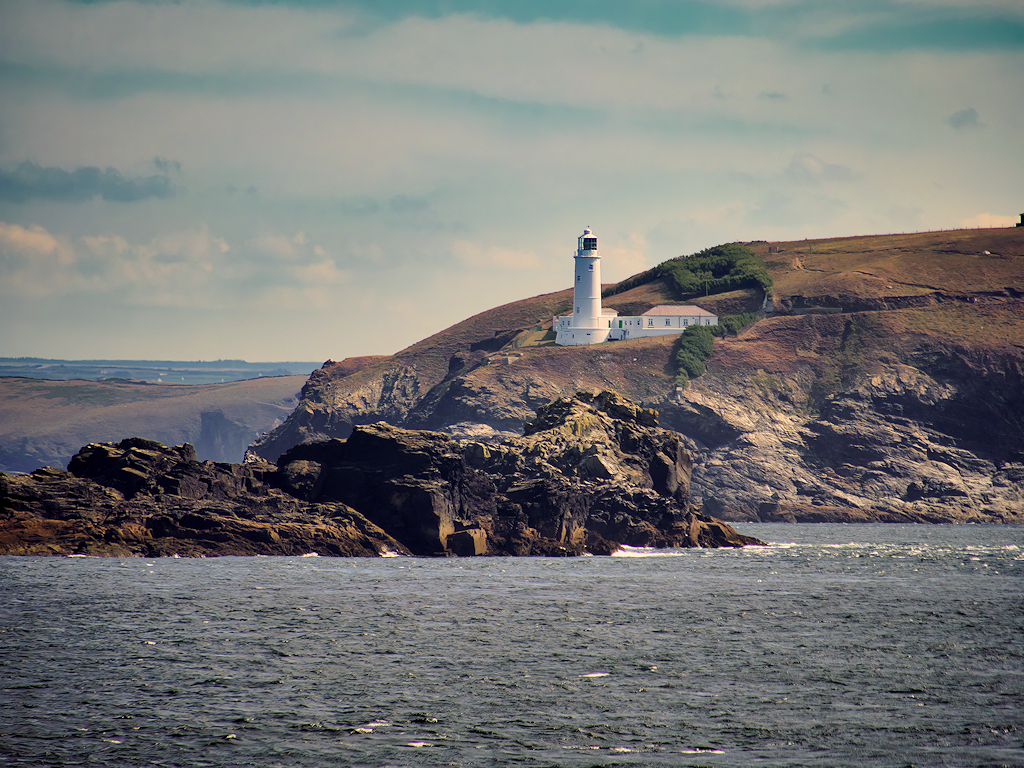
Seaward view of the lighthouse

In 1995 the lighthouse was automated and became unmanned. The red colour was removed from the light at this time and the rotation speed of the optic was slowed. By this stage the engine house was suffering cracking due to erosion; with automation a new fog signal was installed (a stack of electric emitters placed at the foot of the lighthouse) whereupon the old engine house was demolished.

The fog signal was decommissioned in 2012. In 2023 the revolving optic was removed, having been in service for over 110 years. It was replaced by a fixed LED lantern, which now produces the required flash. At the same time nominal range of the light was reduced from 21 to 18 nautical miles.

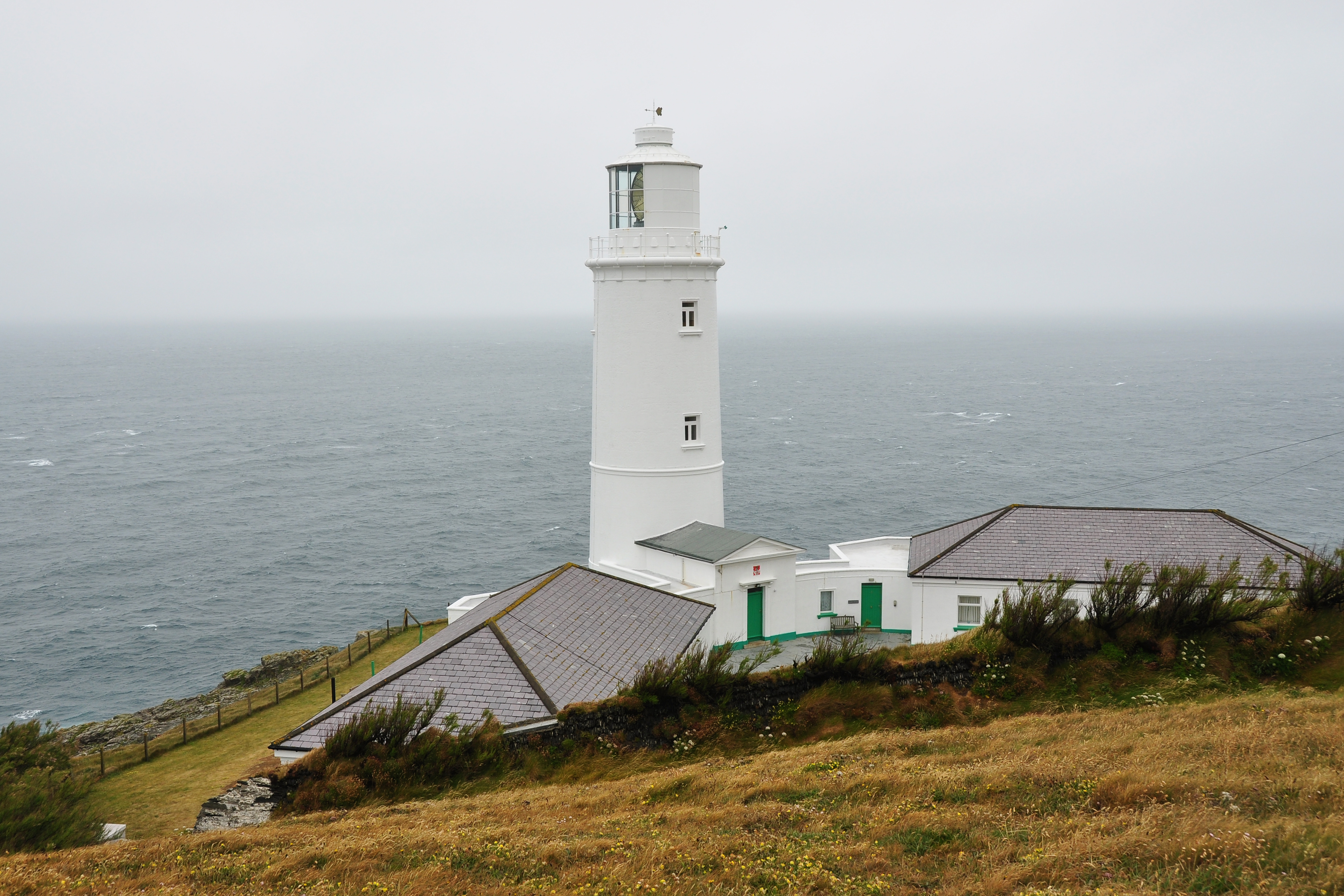
Former keepers' cottages alongside the lighthouse.

The former keepers' cottages (arranged in two semi-detached pairs) are nowadays available to rent as holiday accommodation.

== See also ==
- List of lighthouses in England
