= Henry Norris (engineer) =

British civil engineer

- Born: 3 March 1816; Poplar, London, England
- Died: 11 May 1878 (aged 62); Stratford, Essex, England
- Citizenship: Great Britain
- Engineering career
- Discipline: civil engineering
- Practice name: Messrs. Walker & Burges
- Projects: Eddystone lighthouse Smeaton's Tower repairs, Trevose Head lighthouse, East Bute docks Cardiff, Spurn Low lighthouse, Whitby lighthouse, Europa Point Gibraltar, St Bees lighthouse, Souter lighthouse, Hartland Point lighthouse

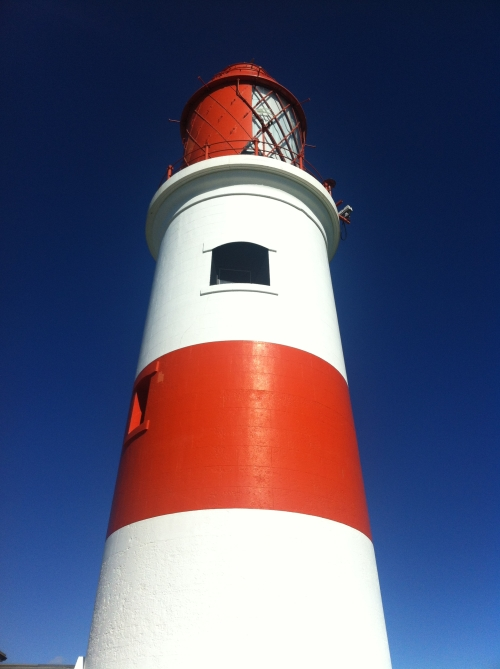
Souter lighthouse tower at Lizard Point, Marsden

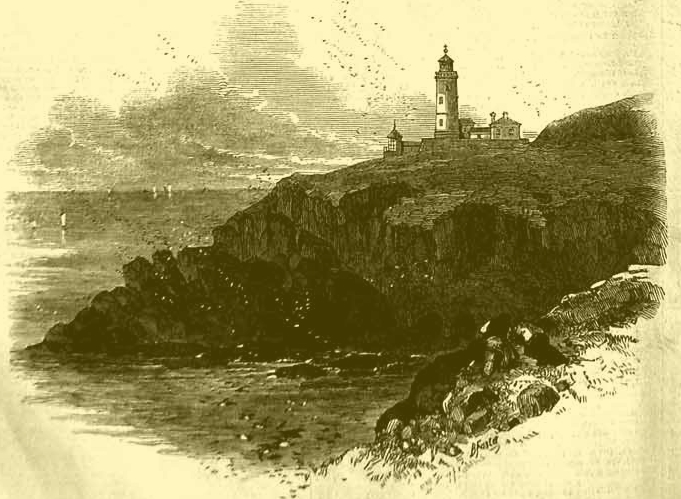
The newly built Trevose Head lighthouse, Cornwall, England from "The Illustrated London News" 1847

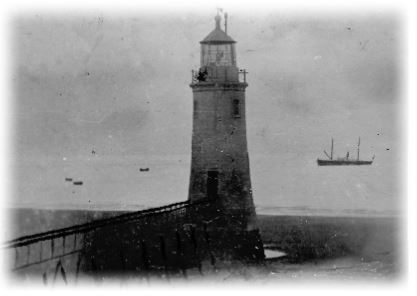
Spurn Low lighthouse, Spurn Point while still operational

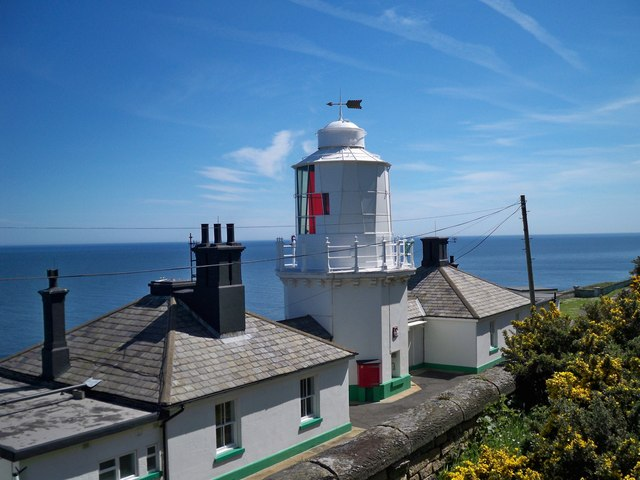
Whitby Lighthouse, Ling Hill, Whitby

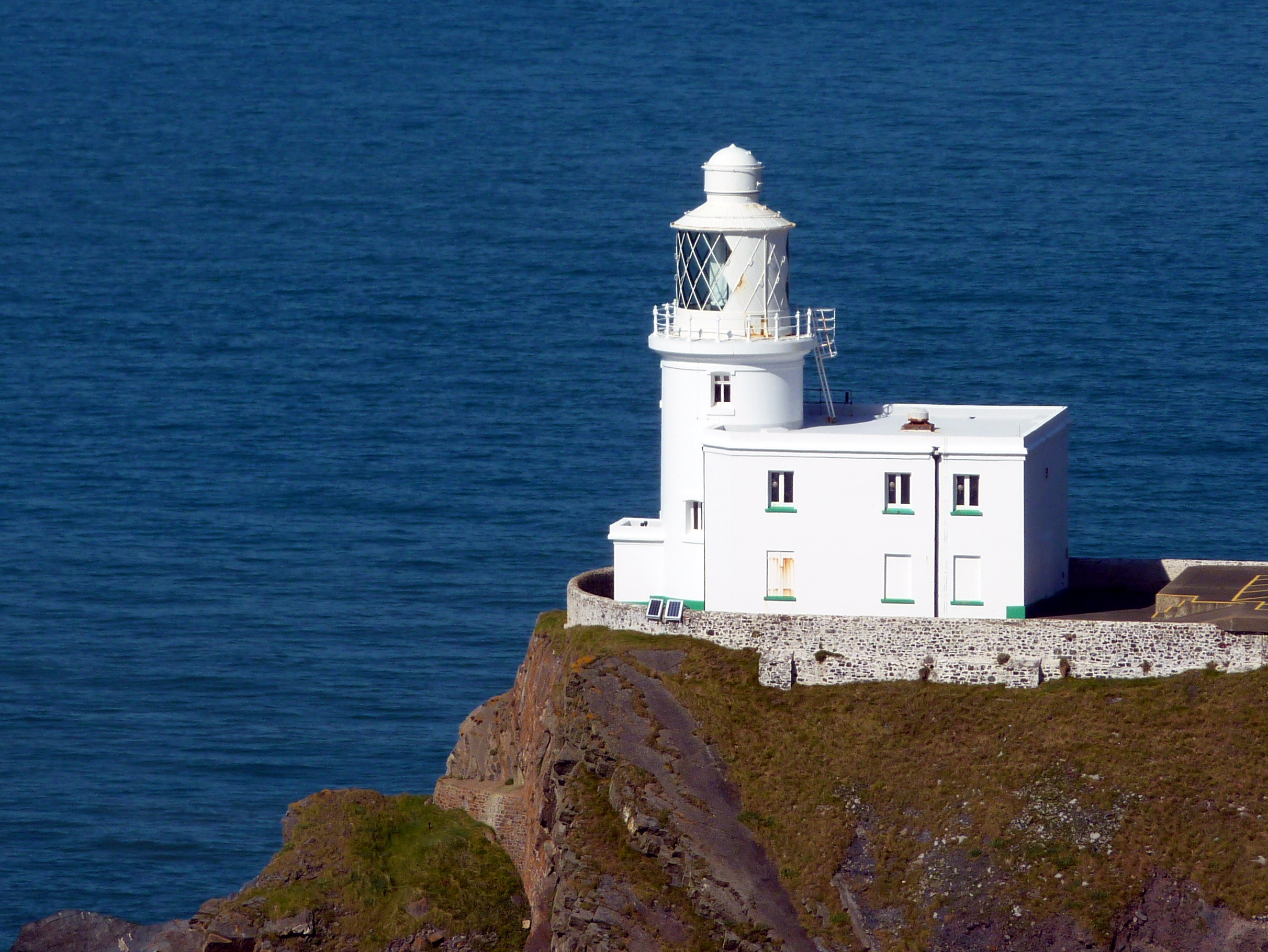
Hartland Point Lighthouse, Devon

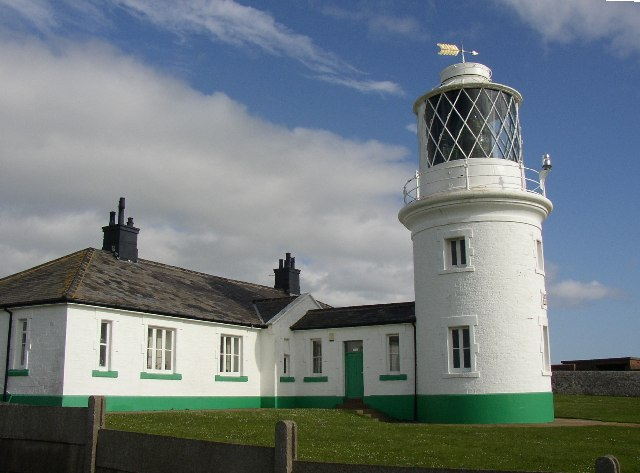
St Bees lighthouse, St Bees Head, Cumbria

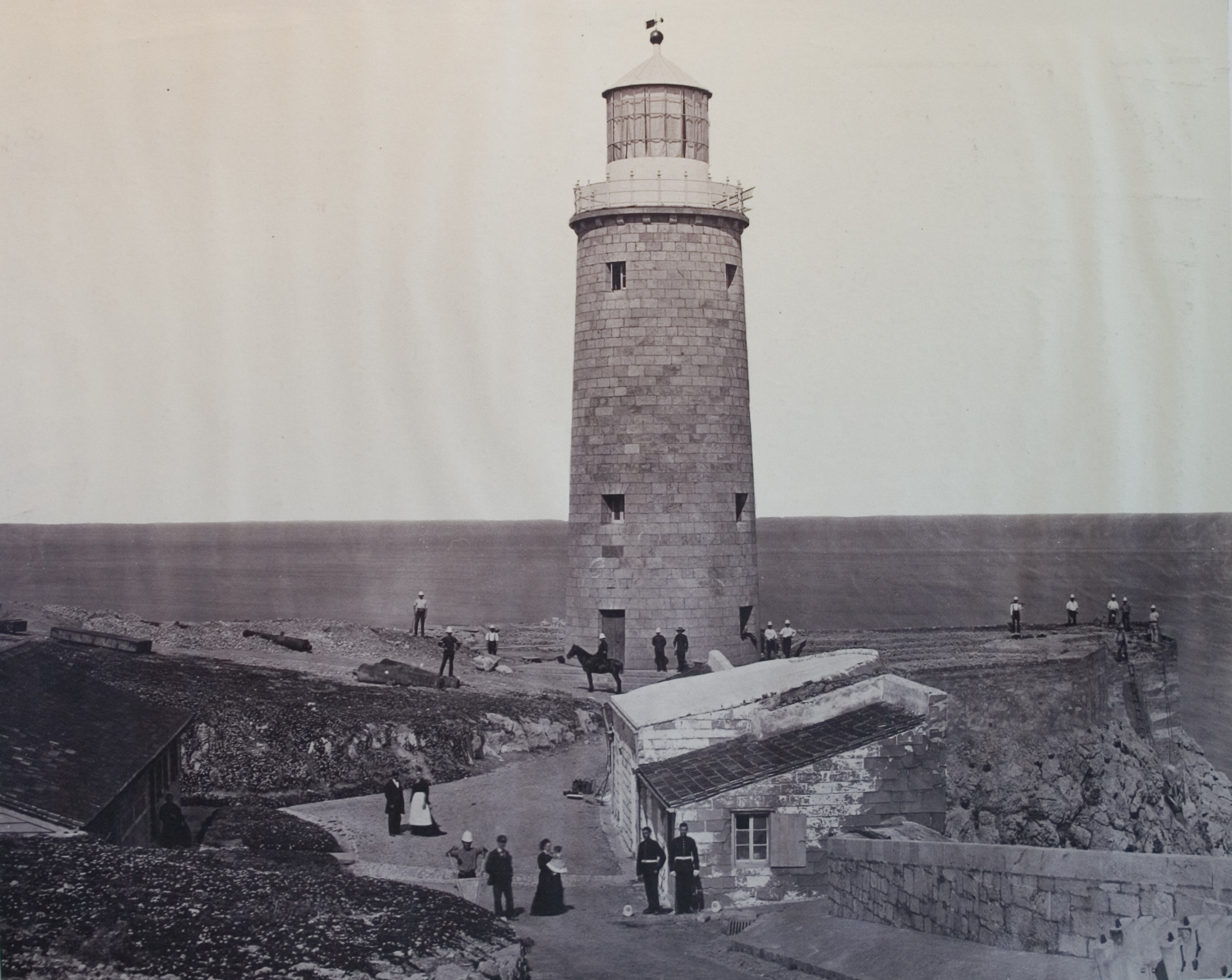
Europa Point Lighthouse, Gibraltar in 1879

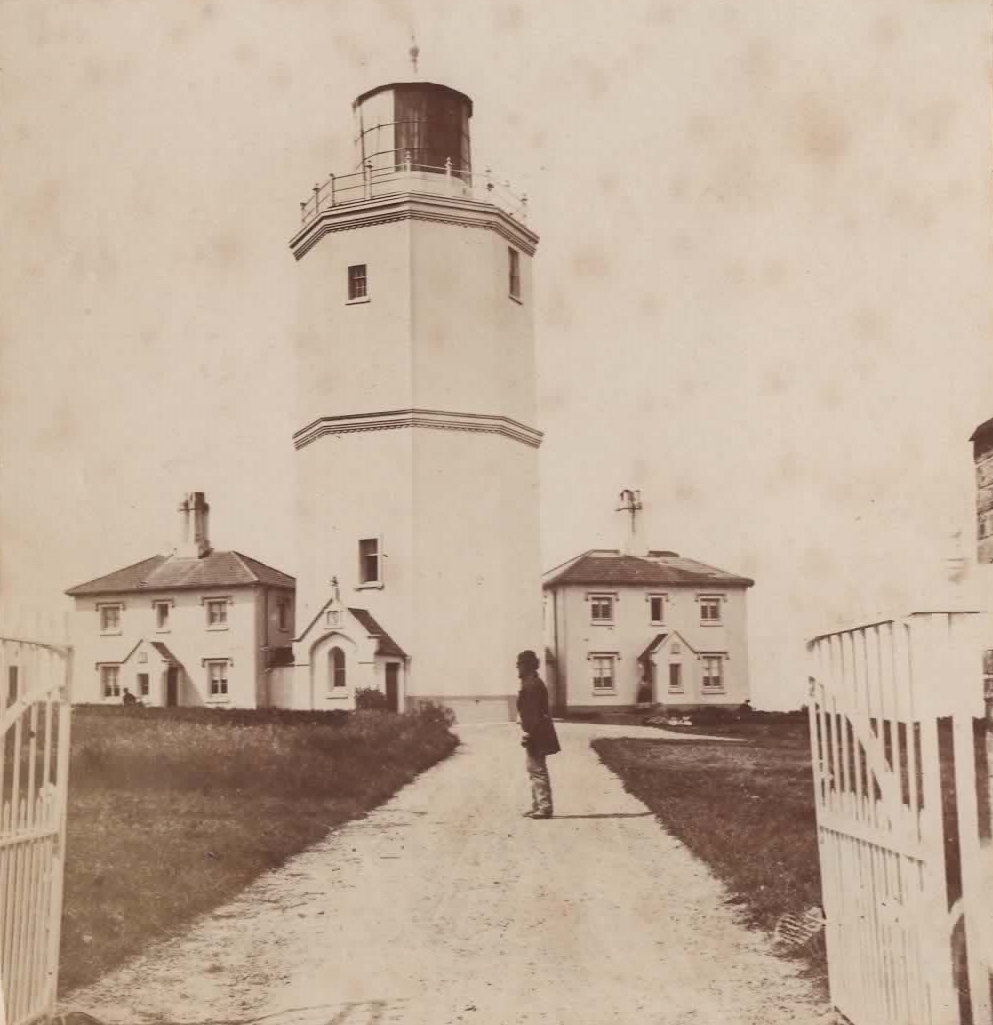
North Foreland lighthouse at Broadstairs, Kent about 1880 with modernised light as it was after 1860

Henry Norris (1816–1878) was a British civil engineer born in Poplar, London, the son of several generations of house carpenters. He was the resident engineer for lighthouse construction projects under contract to Trinity House from civil engineers Messrs. Walker & Burges, the firm of James Walker and Alfred Burges, and later on oversaw the building of Souter Lighthouse, the world's first lighthouse specifically designed & built to be powered by electricity.

He died at Stratford, London and is buried at Tower Hamlets Cemetery. His grave was located during ground clearing work in 2013 a few metres from that of John Buckley (VC).

Henry Norris noted projects around the coast of England and Wales, included:

== Projects ==
- Eddystone Lighthouse repairs to Smeaton's Tower in 1841 "The Eddystone Lighthouse has within the past few months undergone a complete renovation, under the direction of Mr. Henry Norris, engineer, from the establishment of Messrs. Walker and Burges, the contractors under the Trinity Board. The exterior of the building has been pointed with cement, a large cavity in the rock, close to the foundation of the light-house has been filled up and the water casks formerly in use have been removed, and commodious tanks erected in their stead." Despite these repairs to the foundations, later failure of the rock itself upon which the tower was built led to Smeaton's Tower replacement.
- Trevose Head Lighthouse (1844–47) built at Trevose Head, Cornwall. During his time there he met & in 1847 married Anna Maria Morcumb a daughter of the farmer at the adjacent Trevose Farm, they would return here to have most of their children baptised at St Merryn church.
- East Bute Dock at Cardiff Docks, survey in 1851 for their designer James Walker of Messrs. Walker & Burges
- Merthyr Tydfil Workhouse, 1851 during a brief partnership in Cardiff with Daniel Thomas as Messrs. Thomas and Norris, awarded the contract for its building after the previous contractor pulled out.
- Spurn Low lighthouse at Spurn on the point at the mouth of the Humber in 1852
- Whitby Lighthouse - the twin lights of Whitby North and Whitby South, near Ling Hill, High Whitby (1857–58) "Messrs. Walker, Burgess, and Cooper, of Great George Street, London, are the engineers, and Mr. Henry Norris, of London, is the superintendent of the works"
- North Foreland lighthouse March 1860, conversion of the light to a dioptric
- Europa Point Lighthouse, Gibraltar Repairs and upgrade of the lamp (1863–64) "The lighthouse at Gibraltar is undergoing considerable alterations and repairs, under the directions of Mr. Norris, of the Trinity House, who has been sent out from England for this purpose."
- St Bees Lighthouse (1865–66) "The new lantern was originally intended for Gibraltar, Mr Norris, the resident engineer, who has the superintendence of the work for Trinity House, says that it is one of the clearest and most perfect pieces of mechanism he ever saw in his life."
- Souter Lighthouse (1869–71) "This new lighthouse has been completed so far that it is ready for the lantern, the top-stone of the tower having been fixed on Saturday. The remainder of the works are being pushed rapidly forward under the supervision of Mr H. Norris, the board and resident engineer. The new lighthouse is expected to be in working order for December and will be one of the best structures of its kind on the coast."
- Hartland Point Lighthouse 1873-74
