= St Bees Head =

Headland in Cumbria, England

Coordinates: 54.50398°N 3.63229°W

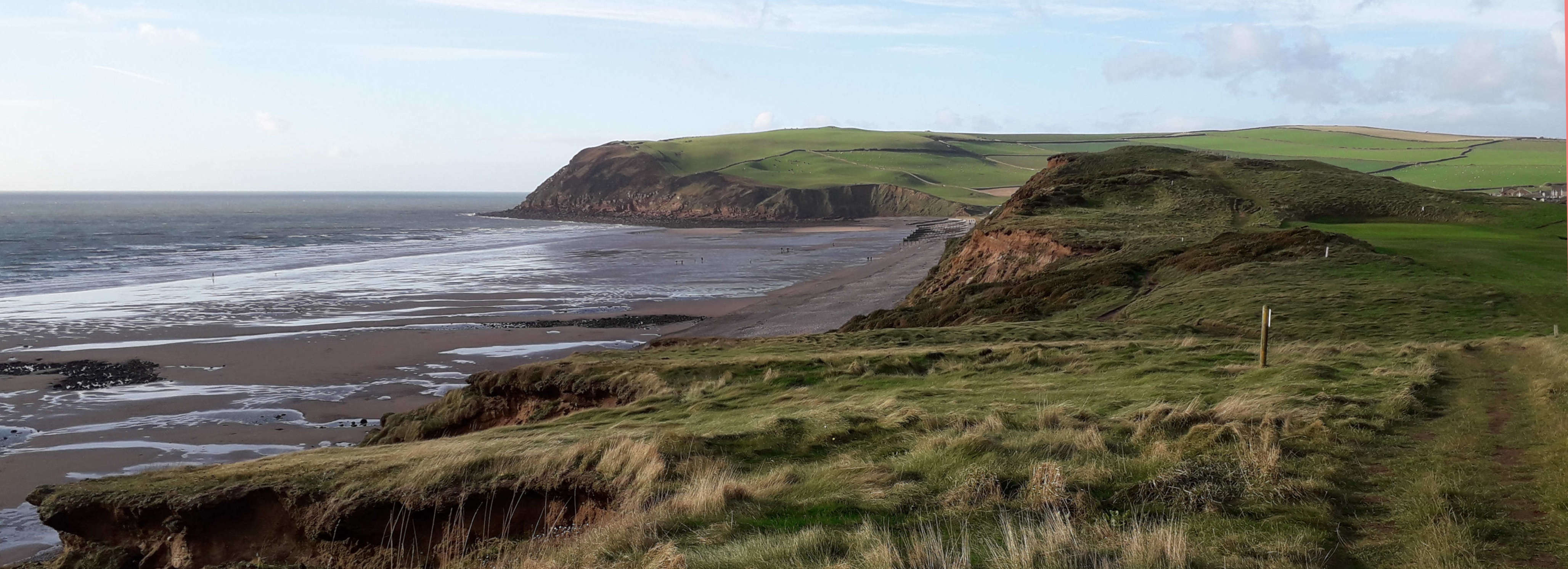
View of St Bees South Head and beach

Location in the former Copeland Borough

St Bees Head is a headland on the west coast of the English county of Cumbria. It is named after the nearby village of St Bees, and is also close to Whitehaven.

The headland is the only stretch of Heritage Coast on the coastline of North West England, and is a Site of Special Scientific Interest. The sea off the Head is protected as part of the Cumbria Coast Marine Conservation Zone. It lies on two long-distance footpaths, the Cumbria Coastal Way and Alfred Wainwright's Coast to Coast Walk. Both long-distance footpaths follow the edge of the cliffs, which rise to 90 metres above sea level and have views of the Cumbrian mountains and coast.

== North Head ==
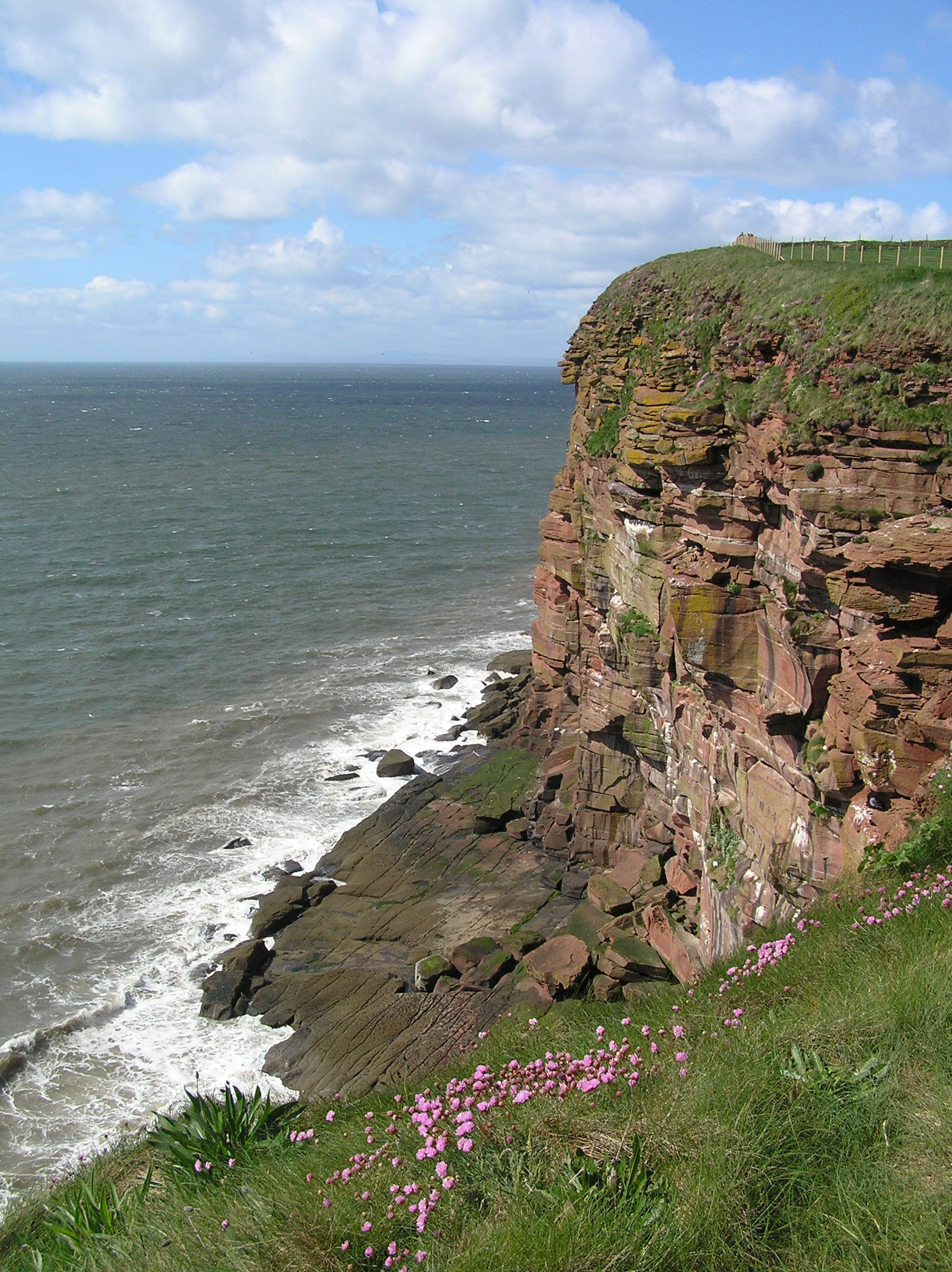
The North Head

The true geographical head is the North Head, which is the most westerly point of Northern England and is the site of St Bees Lighthouse. During WW2 a radar station was operated from here, and some of the buildings can still be seen adjacent to the lighthouse. The foghorn building is to the west of the lighthouse, but is now disused. The lighthouse is still operating, but is unmanned. Next to the coastal path north of the lighthouse is Birkhams quarry which is still in use for extracting St Bees sandstone. The rocks on the sea platform at the North Head are now a bouldering area used by climbers, and there are a number of bolted climbing routes on the cliff itself.

=== Bird reserve ===
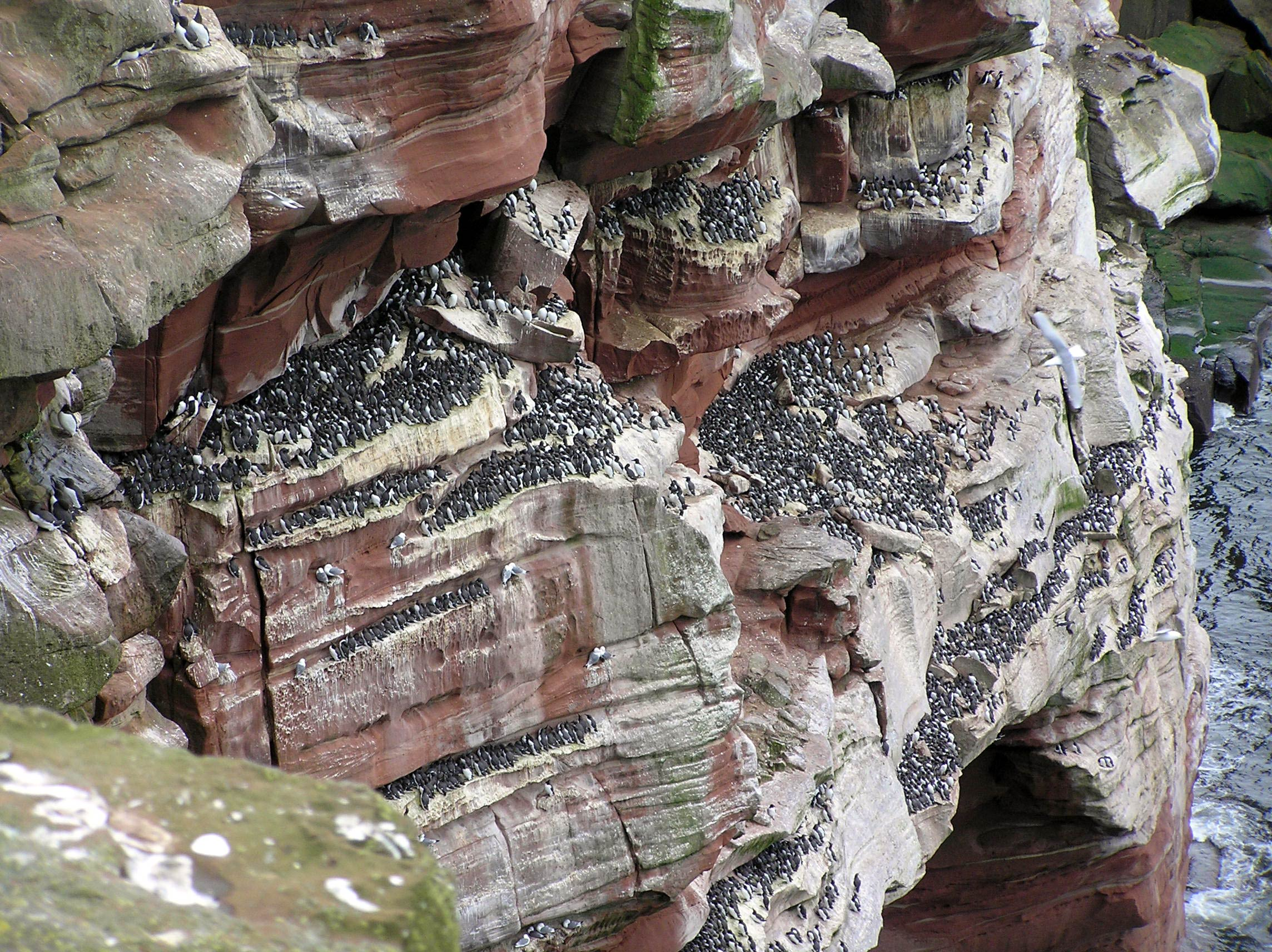
Guillemots on the North Head

The RSPB maintains a reserve, which includes kittiwakes, fulmars, guillemots, razorbills, cormorants, puffins, shags and herring gulls. It is the only breeding place in England for black guillemots. Several other birds are known to use this site regularly for breeding and these include the tawny owl, sparrowhawk, peregrine, raven and the rock pipit, which is known to breed in only one other site in Cumbria. There are observation stations on the North Head footpath.

== South Head ==
The South Head is known locally as "Tomlin" and dominates the long sandy St Bees Beach. At the top of the footpath from St Bees are the remains of the coastguard lookout. This now has a viewing table in its ruins.

== Fleswick Bay ==
Between the two headlands is Fleswick Bay. This is accessible only on foot or from the sea, and consists of a shingle beach on a wave-cut platform bounded by high sandstone cliffs. The Coast to Coast Walk descends to the bay en route to the North Head.

== Flora ==
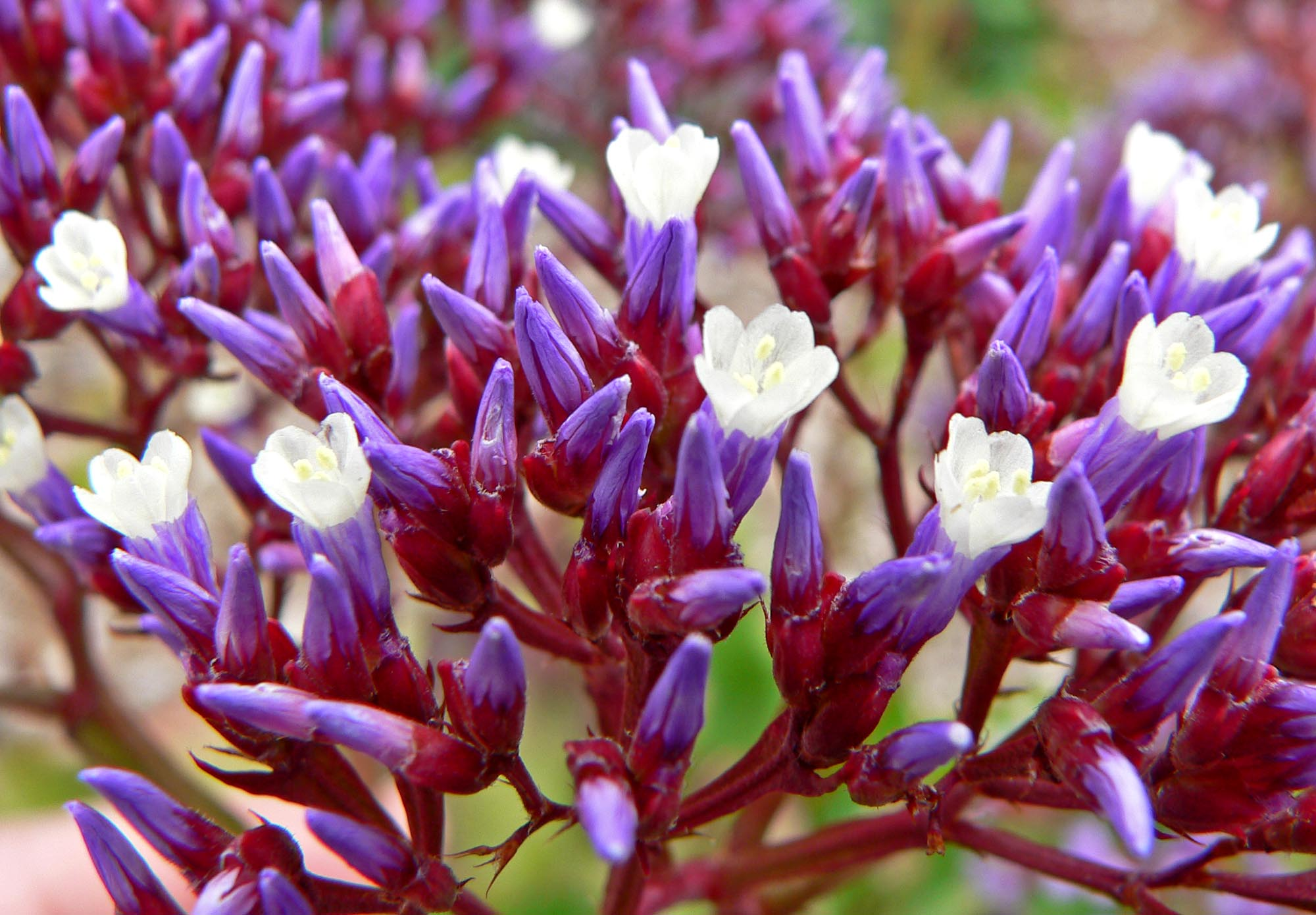
Sea Lavender

The rugged cliff face supports diverse flora mainly due to the nature of the rock formations. Species found lower down are sea pink or thrift (Armeria maritima), common scurvygrass (Cochlearia officinalis), sea campion (Silene uniflora), sea spleenwort (Asplenium marinum), rock samphire (Crithmum maritimum) and the rare rock sea lavender (Limonium binervosum). Near the cliff top is bloody cranesbill (Geranium sanguineum) wood vetch (Vicia sylvatica), orpine (Sedum telephium) and soft shield-fern (Polystichum setiferum). Along the cliff top, there can be found dyer’s greenweed (Genista tinctoria), western gorse (Ulex gallii), heather (Calluna vulgaris) and bracken (Pteridium aquilinum).

== Physical features ==
The cliffs are composed of a red Permian and Triassic sandstone about 200 Million years old. St Bees sandstone was created by water-borne sand and has a very small grain size, making it a very workable stone still much in demand for building. The mica in the stone gives it a sparkling effect. St Bees sandstone occurs as far north as Brampton, but it is named after its most prominent outcrop here at St Bees.

The SSSI citation carries a description of the interesting geological features. On the headland itself is evidence of erosional features, wave cut notch and a wave-cut platform. On St Bees Beach to the south to lessen the effects of longshore drift, a row of nine groynes have been put in place. Further south, St Bees Beach is backed by small mud cliffs which are a common place to study the glacial moraines that formed them. The shingle both at St Bees and Fleswick bay show a huge variety of glacier-borne stones.

== Gallery ==
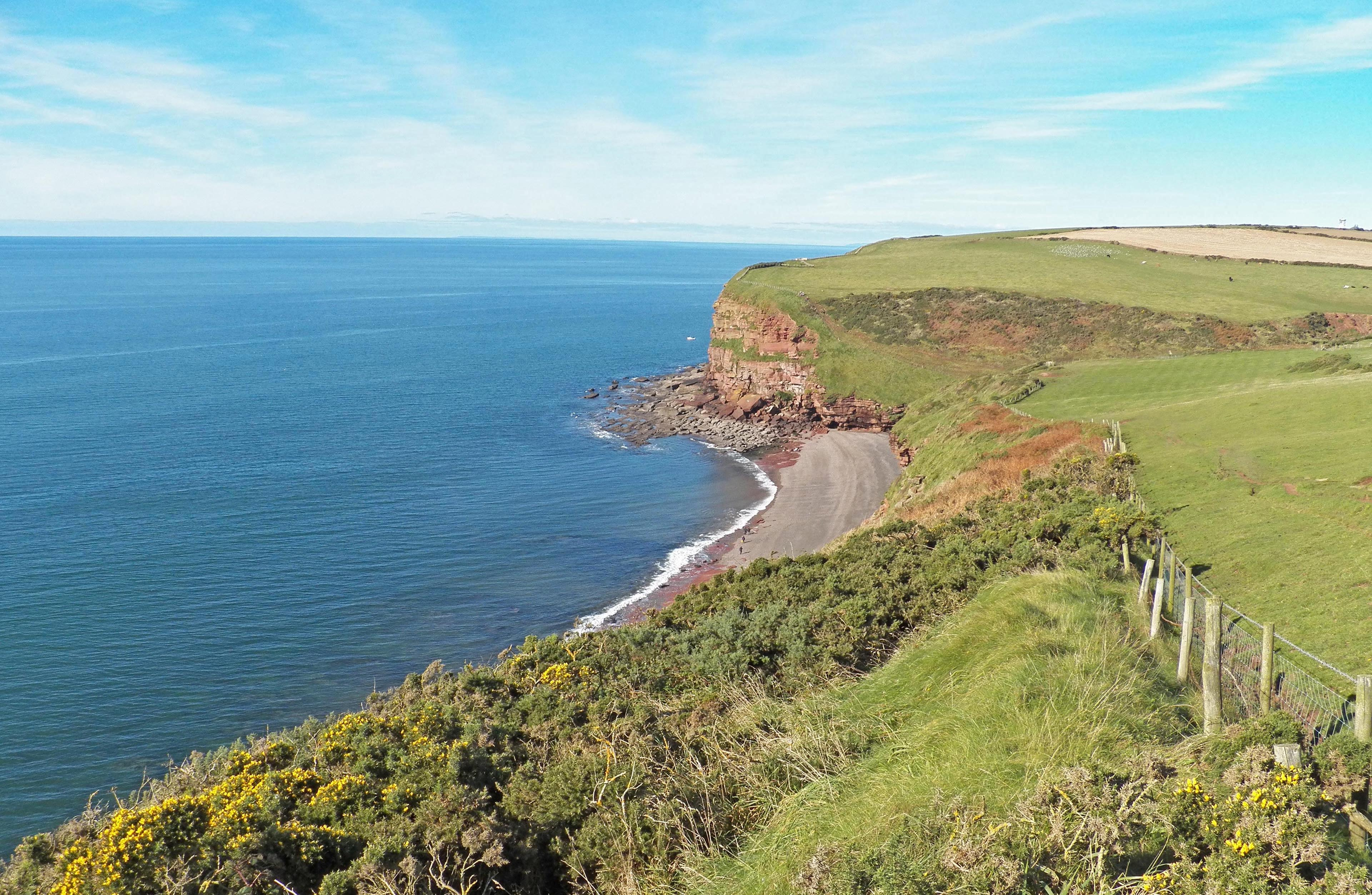
The North Head and Fleswick Bay seen from the St Bees path

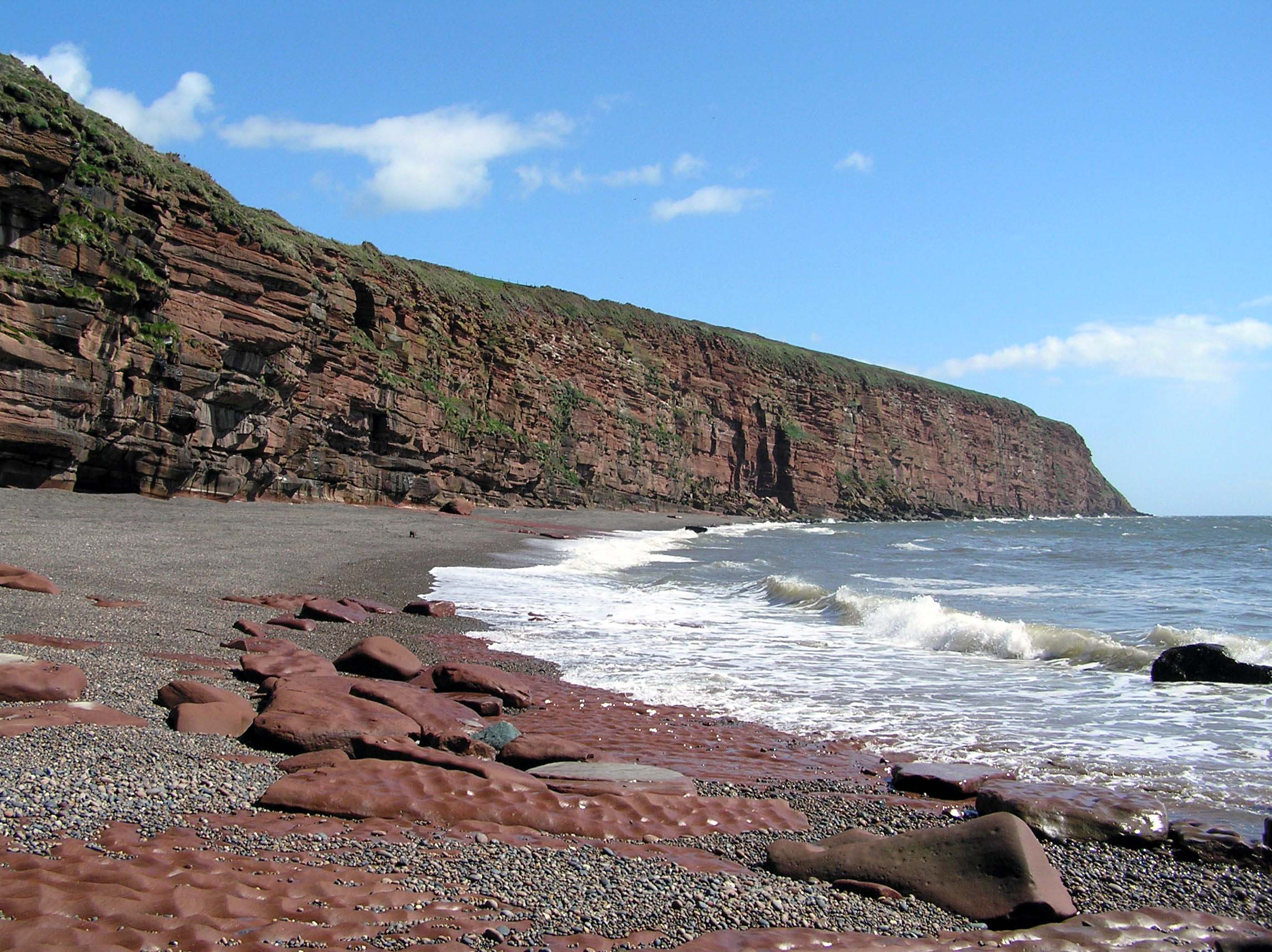
Fleswick Bay, looking south

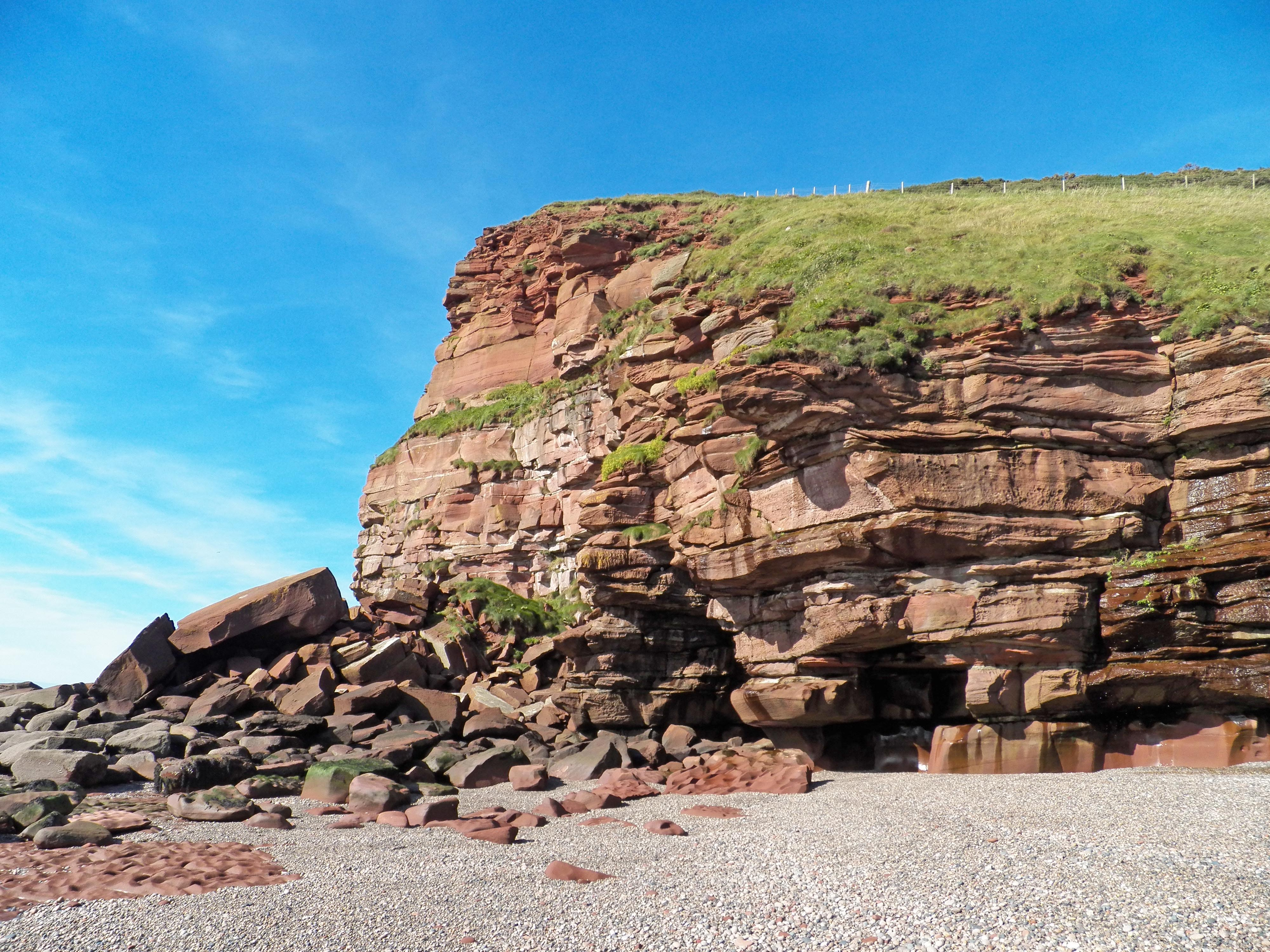
The north end of Fleswick Bay

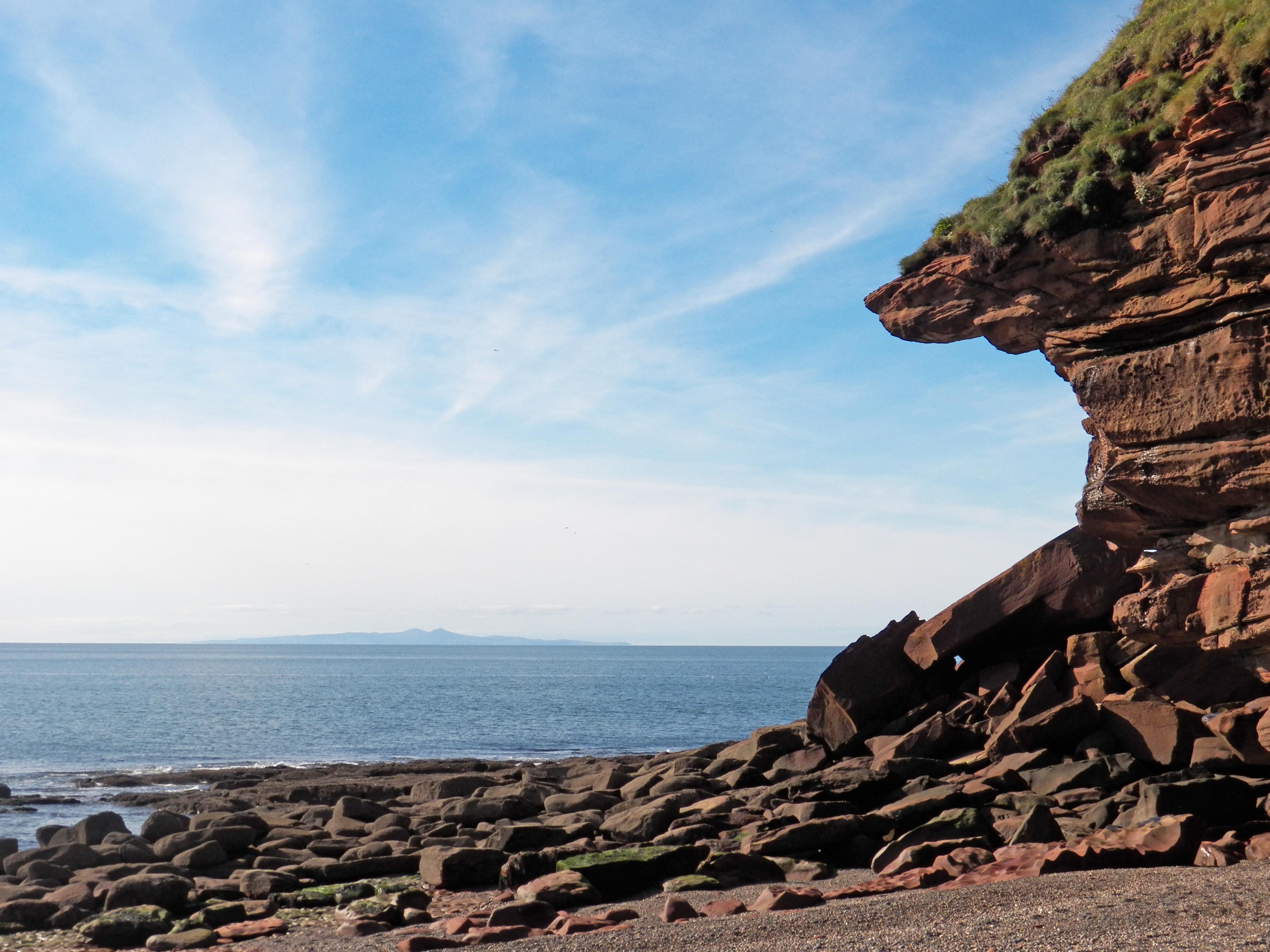
The Isle of Man seen from Fleswick Bay

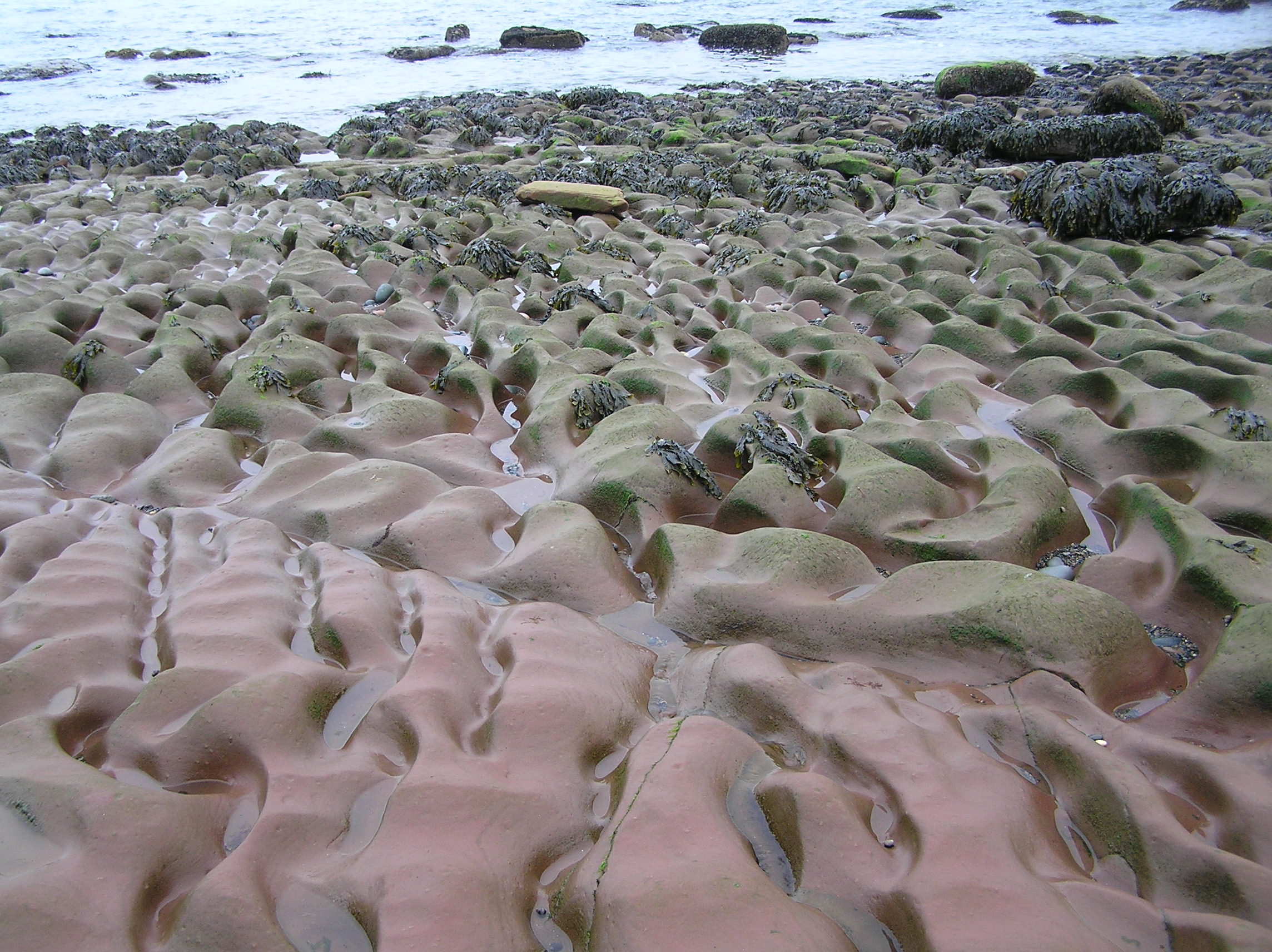
Wave-cut platform at Fleswick Bay

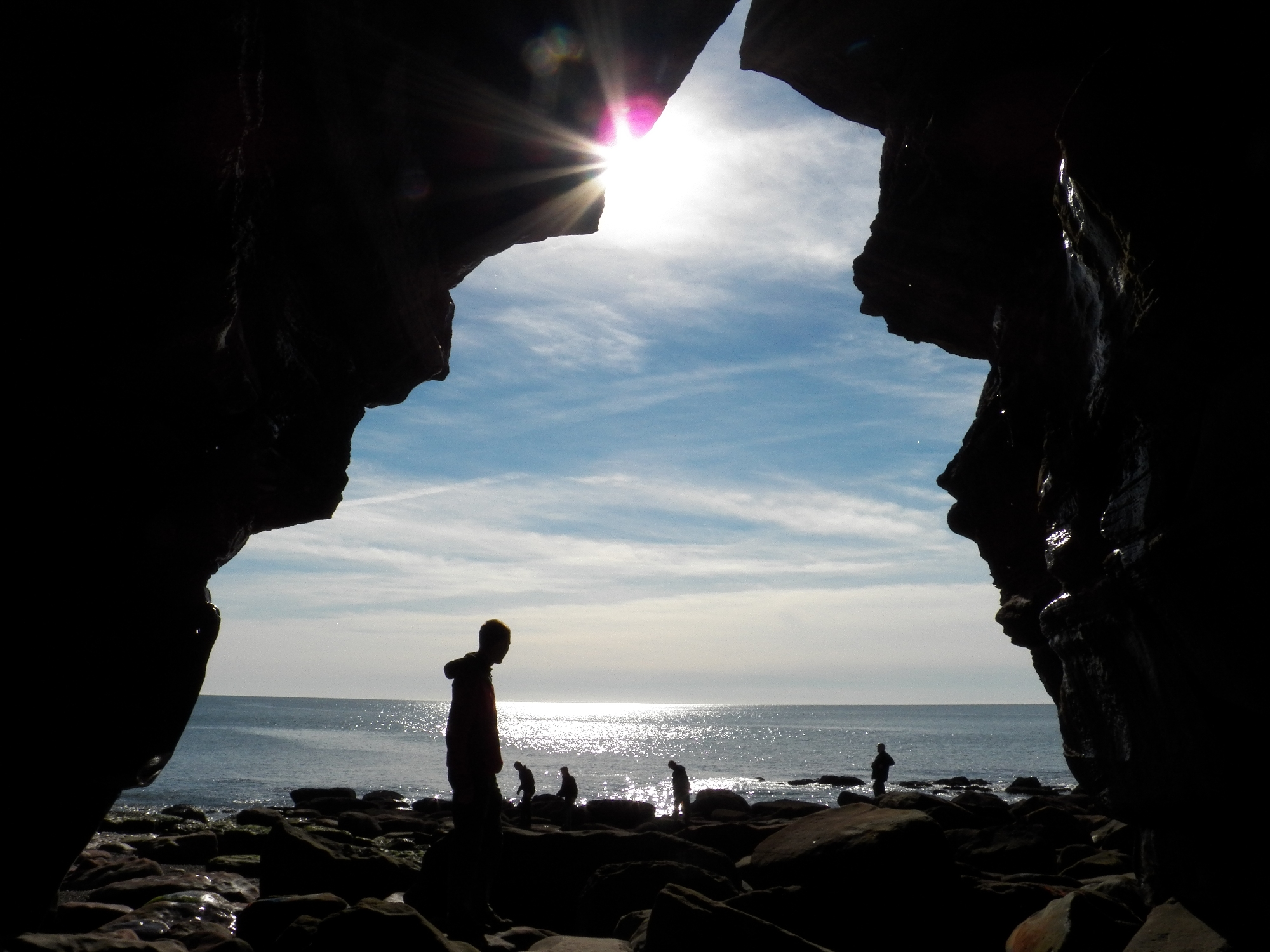
A cave at Fleswick Bay

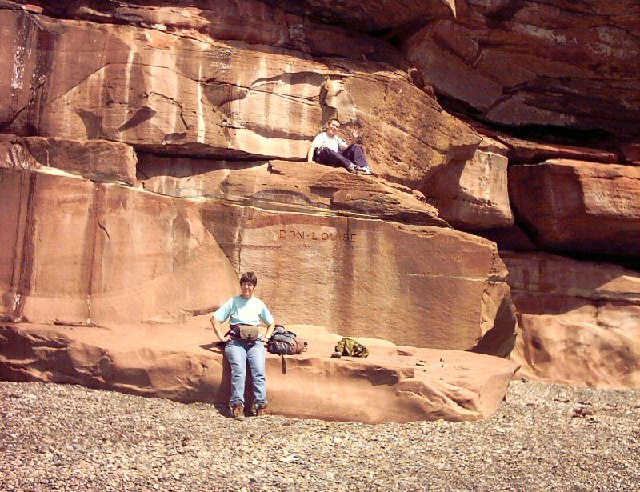
Sandstone cliff formation at Fleswick Bay
