= James Nicholas Douglass =

British engineer (1826–1898)

Sir James Nicholas Douglass FRS
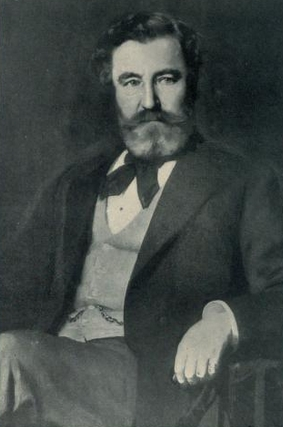
- Born: 16 October 1826
- Died: 19 June 1898 (aged 71)
- Occupation: civil engineer

Sir James Nicholas Douglass, FRS (16 October 1826 – 19 June 1898) was an English civil engineer, a prolific lighthouse builder and designer, most famous for the design and construction of the fourth Eddystone Lighthouse, for which he was knighted.

== Biography ==
James Nicholas Douglass was born in Bow, London, in 1826, the eldest son of Nicholas Douglass, also a civil engineer. After serving an apprenticeship with the Hunter and English company, he joined the engineering department of Trinity House, the United Kingdom's lighthouse authority.

Along with his brother William, James worked as an assistant to his father during the construction of James Walker's Bishop Rock Lighthouse in the Scilly Isles, earning the nickname 'Cap'n Jim' during the process. After a brief period working for the Newcastle carriage builders R J & R Laycock, he returned in 1854 to assist in the lighthouse's final completion and to marry his fiancée Mary Tregarthen. Trinity House then engaged him as Resident Engineer to design the Smalls Lighthouse off the coast of Pembrokeshire, his first solo project.

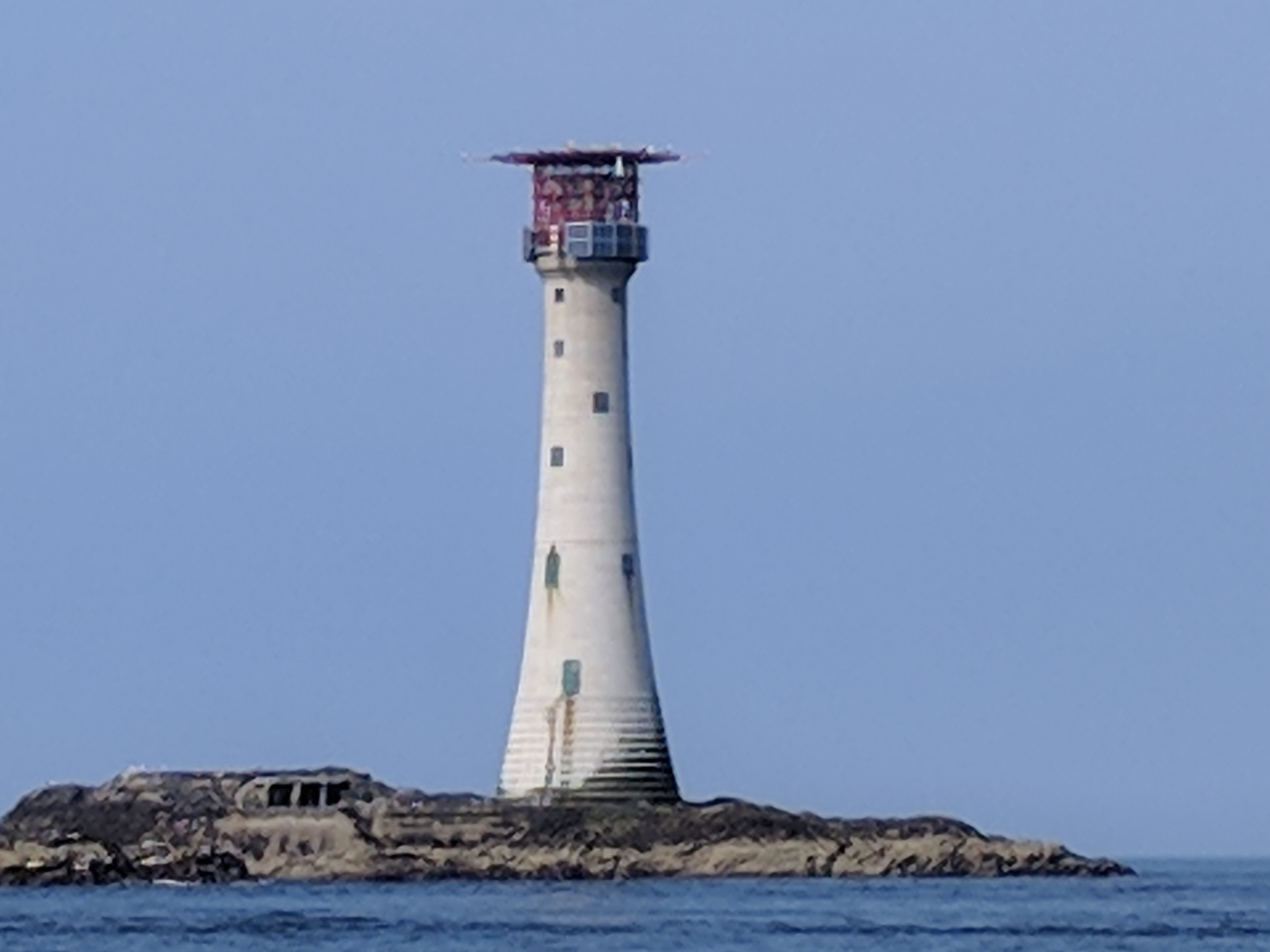
The Smalls Lighthouse off the Welsh coast, Douglass's first solo project. It is still in use today.

Douglass based his plans on the proven design of John Smeaton for the third Eddystone lighthouse, which had used dovetailed granite blocks for strength. Douglass sourced his granite from the De Lank Quarries near Bodmin, Cornwall, and had it shipped to Solva on the Welsh coast where it was dressed (cut and shaped). The Smalls light was completed in 1861, at a cost of £50,125, and in a record-breaking time of two years. Douglass immediately went on to supervise the construction of the Wolf Rock Lighthouse, designed by James Walker, and was appointed as Engineer-in-Chief of Trinity House in 1862.

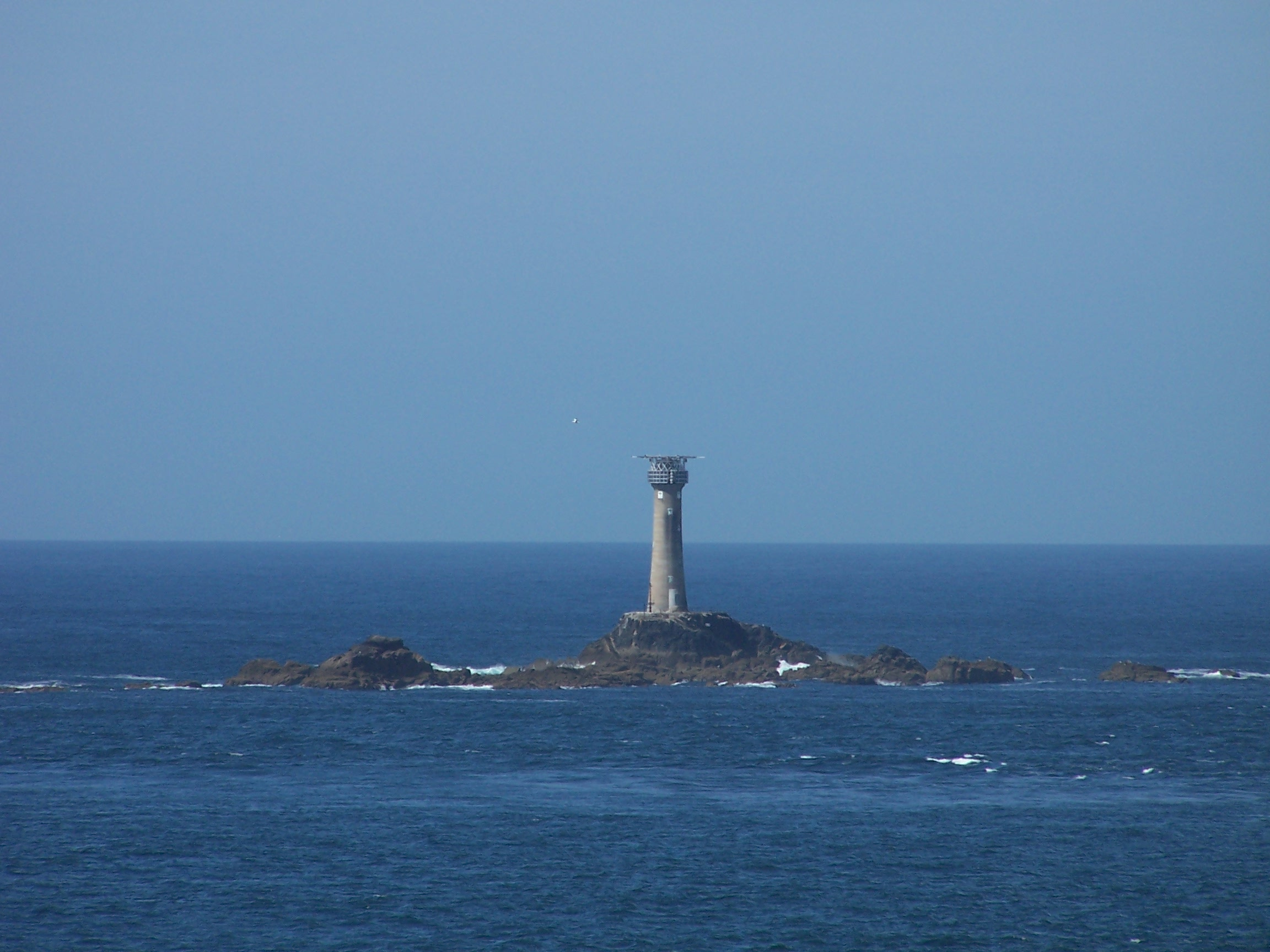
The Longships Lighthouse, designed by Douglass and completed in 1875.

Douglass's design for the Smalls light was a great success and he went on to design some twenty lighthouses for Trinity House, including some wave-swept towers which remain major engineering achievements, such as the Longships Lighthouse off Land's End. Douglass's designs were also used in Sri Lanka. His brother William became the Engineer-in-Chief to the Commissioners of Irish Lights in 1878, serving in the post until 1900.

The crowning achievement of James Douglass's career was the construction of the fourth Eddystone Lighthouse. Douglass was engaged to build a replacement for Smeaton's tower in 1877, and the new lighthouse was completed in 1882, the project being finished both without loss of life or serious injury and £18,745 under budget. Douglass received a knighthood shortly afterwards for his services to engineering. He also carried out work on improving illumination using oil and gas burners and electricity.

In 1887 Douglass was elected a Fellow of the Royal Society. He retired in 1892, being succeeded as Engineer-in-Chief by Thomas Matthews, and died in 1898 at his home on the Isle of Wight. His youngest son Alfred also trained as a lighthouse engineer. His eldest surviving son was William Tregarthen Douglass, who gained a considerable reputation as a civil engineer in the construction of lighthouses.

== Controversy ==
Douglass was involved in two public disputes with John Richardson Wigham. The first was about the best way to power street lights. Wigham claimed that gas lights were superior to oil lamps, Douglass, then chief engineer to Trinity House, disagreed. In 1863 the Dublin Ballast Board funded Wigham's research and the new gas light was installed in the Baily Lighthouse, they then converted other lighthouses until Trinity House prohibited further conversion of lighthouses from oil to gas. After pressure from the Irish Parliamentary Party In 1871 trials were conducted at the two Happisburgh Lighthouses comparing oil with gas. Douglass reported that "the large gas burner was ex-focal and therefore that it was totally useless and wasted".

The second dispute was about whether Douglas’s or Wigham had invented the advanced lenses used at the Eddystone Lighthouse built in 1882. Douglass claimed that the “superposed lenses” at the Eddystone Lighthouse of 1882 were designed by him. Wigham claimed the design was essentially the same as his "bi-form lens" used in the Galley Head lighthouse in 1877, a design Wigham had patented (Patent number 1015) in 1872. Wigham successfully sued Douglass for infringement of patent, and Douglass had to pay £2,500 to Wigham

== Examples of Douglass's designs ==
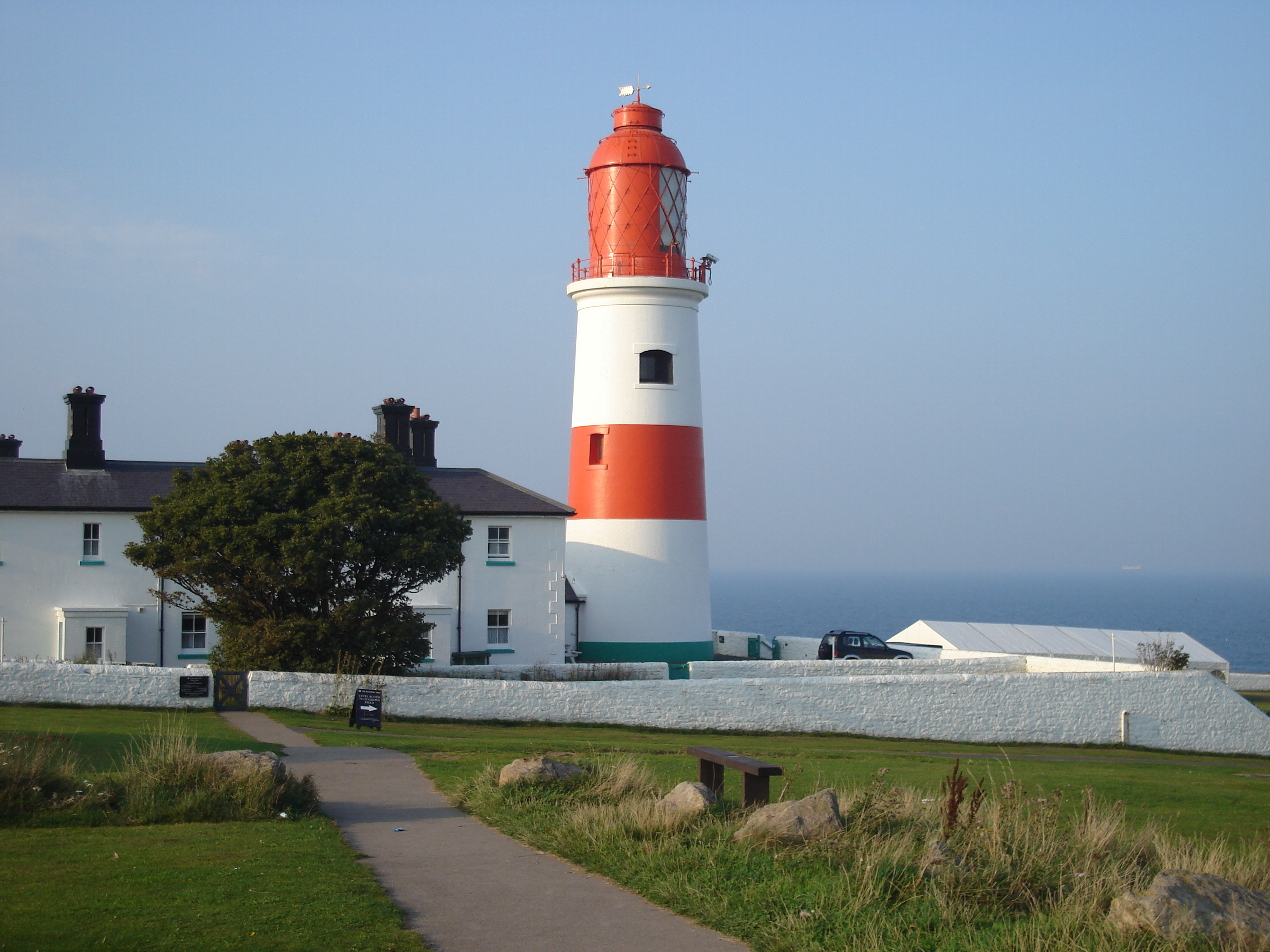
Souter Lighthouse

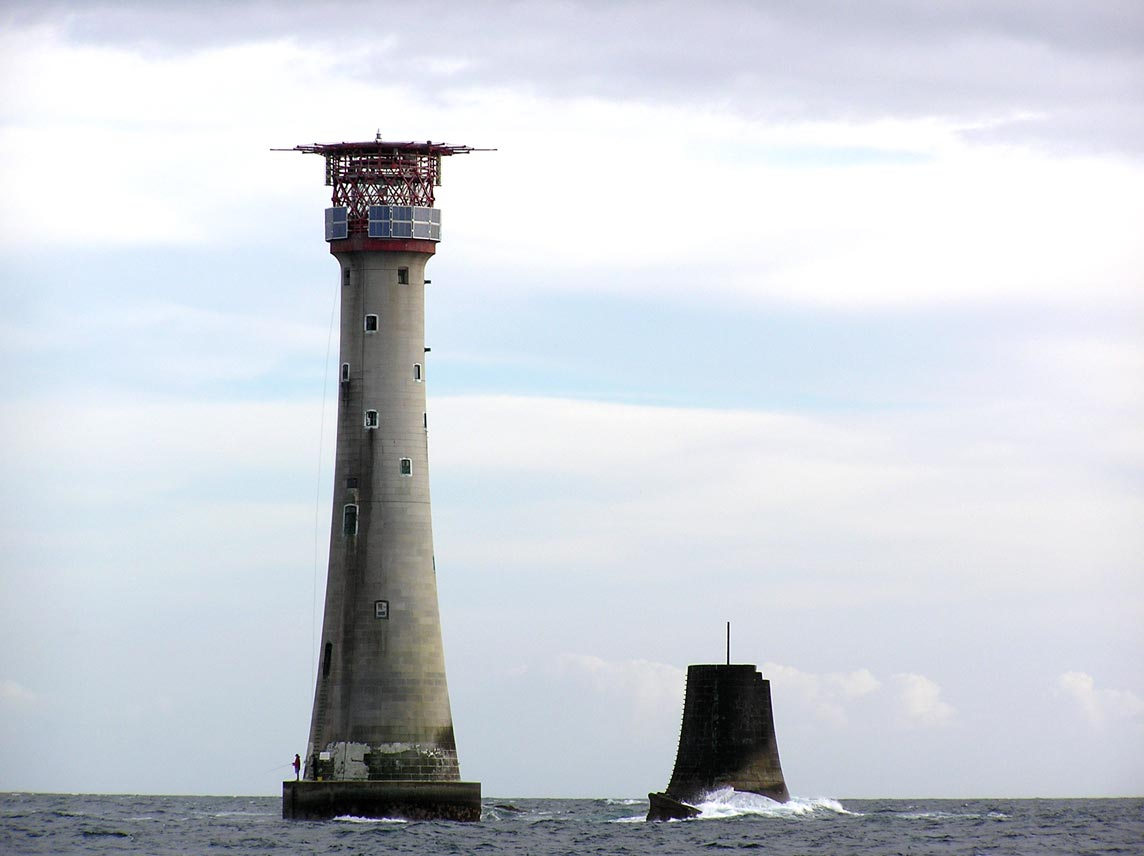
Eddystone Lighthouse

- Bishop Rock Lighthouse (a rebuild of Walker's design)
- Bow Creek Lighthouse at Trinity Buoy Wharf, London
- The fourth Eddystone Lighthouse
- Hartland Point Lighthouse, Devon
- Dondra Head Lighthouse, Sri Lanka
- Great Castle Head range lights, Milford Haven
- Les Hanois Lighthouse, Guernsey
- Longships Lighthouse, off Land's End, Cornwall
- Old Higher Lighthouse, Isle of Portland, Dorset
- Old Lower Lighthouse, Isle of Portland, Dorset
- St Bees Lighthouse, Cumbria
- Smalls Lighthouse, off Pembrokeshire, Wales
- Souter Lighthouse, Tyne and Wear
- Southwold Lighthouse, Suffolk
- Winterton Lighthouse, Norfolk
