= Hartland Point Lighthouse =

Lighthouse in Devon, England

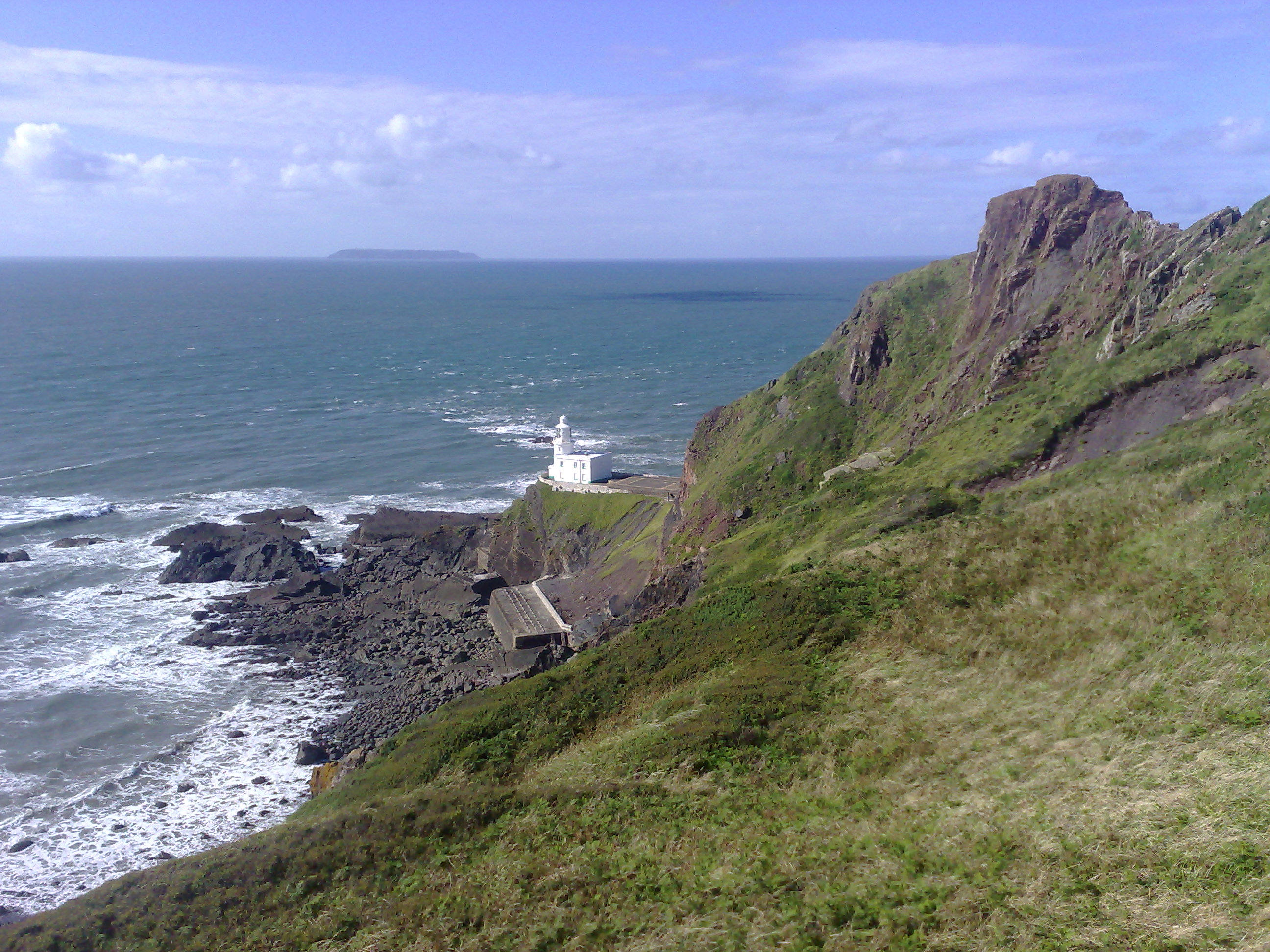
- Hartland Point lighthouse. Lundy Island can be seen on the horizon
- Location: Hartland Point; Devon; England; United Kingdom
- OS grid: SS2297627788
- Coordinates: 51°01′19.4″N 04°31′32.6″W

Tower
- Constructed: 1874 (first)
- Construction: brick tower
- Automated: 1984
- Height: 18 m (59 ft) (first); 1.5 m (4.9 ft) (current)
- Shape: cylindrical tower with balcony and lantern attached to a 2-storey keeper's house
- Markings: white tower and lantern
- Operator: Trinity House
- Heritage: Grade II listed building
- Fog signal: blast every 60s.

Light
- First lit: 2012 (current)
- Deactivated: 2012 (first)
- Focal height: 37 m (121 ft) (first); 20.5 m (67 ft) (current)
- Lens: Bi-form 3rd order 500mm 6 panel rotating
- Intensity: 635 candela
- Range: 25 nmi (46 km) (first); 8 nmi (15 km) (current)
- Characteristic: Fl (6) W15s.

Hartland Point Lighthouse is a Grade II listed building at Hartland Point, Devon, England. The point marks the western limit (on the English side) of the Bristol Channel with the Atlantic Ocean continuing to the west. Trinity House, the lighthouse authority for England and Wales, have a lighthouse on the tip of the peninsula.

== History ==
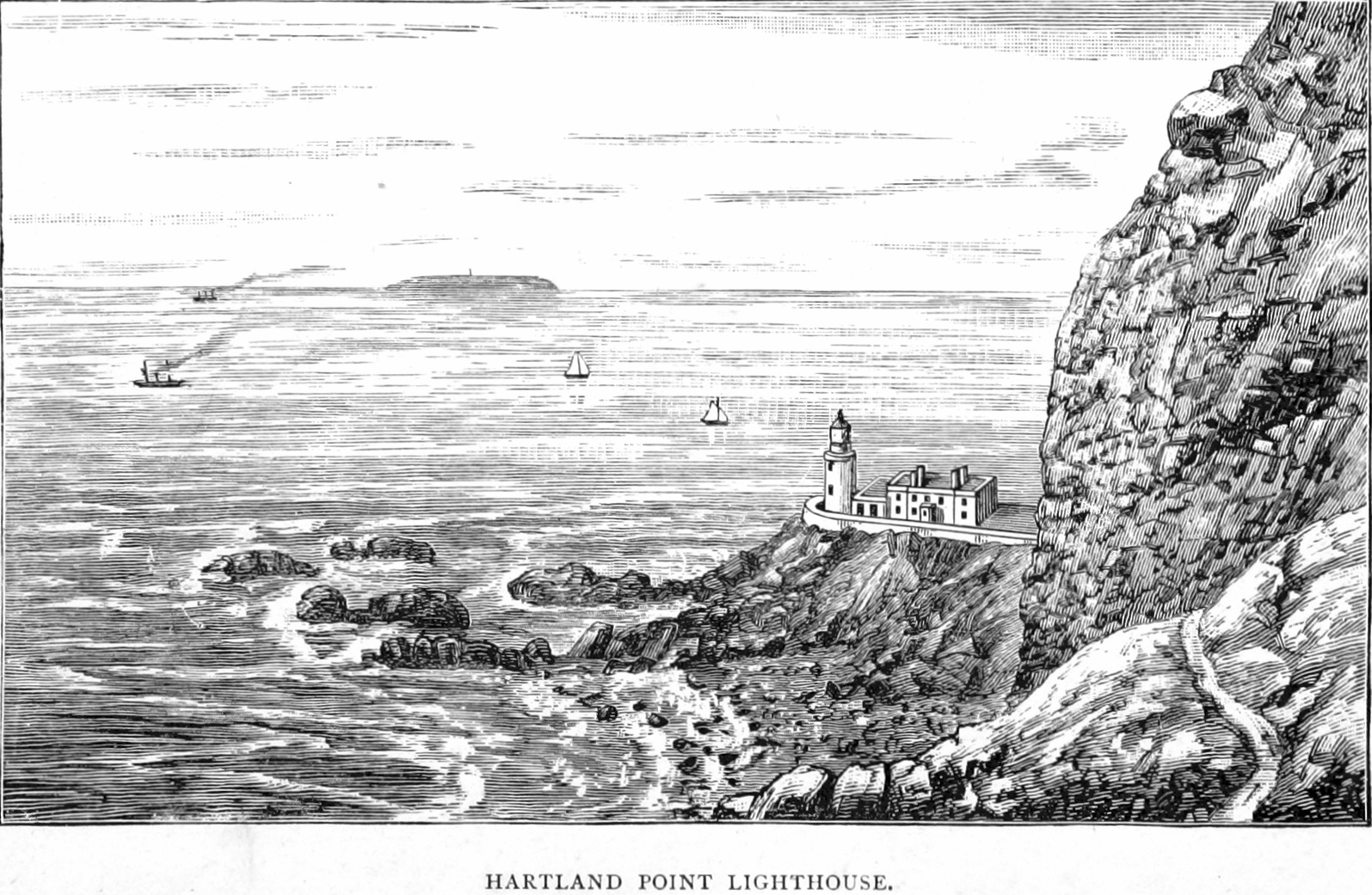
Drawing of the lighthouse, dating from 1884.

Designed by Sir James Douglass, construction began in November 1873 by contractor Mr Yerward of Wales under the supervision of resident engineer Henry Norris, Douglass and Norris having completed Souter Lighthouse in 1871. The tower is 18 metres (59 ft) tall with the lamp being 37 metres (121 ft) above mean sea level. It was blessed by Frederick Temple, Bishop of Exeter, who later became Archbishop of Canterbury, and the light was lit for the first time by Lady Stucley of Hartland Abbey during the opening ceremony on 1 July 1874. The optic, a first-order rotating catadioptric array designed by James Chance, had been installed earlier that year. It flashed alternately red and white, the pattern being two white flashes followed by one red flash every thirty seconds. The optic had ruby glass panels mounted over three of its nine lens panels, these panels being around double the width of the other six (to compensate for the loss of intensity of light passing through coloured glass). The light could be seen up to 25 miles (40 km) away from the coast.

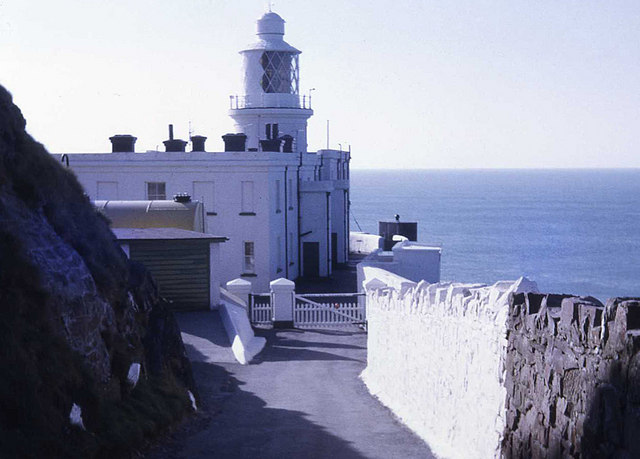
The lighthouse in 1973 with keepers' accommodation to the left and the top of the fog signal house visible to the right.

The lighthouse was initially provided with a reed fog signal, sounding once every two minutes, which was replaced by a two-tone fog siren later in the 19th century; both installations were powered by caloric engines. In 1911 this was replaced with a new reed horn, and oil engines replaced the caloric ones. The fog signal was sounded from a small building a little to the north-west of the lighthouse.

The lighthouse was built with accommodation for four keepers and their families; it was protected by a 30 metres (98 ft) long sea wall which was built in 1925 to prevent erosion of the rocks on which it stands. The large concrete structures immediately to the south of the lighthouse were to provide the keepers with fresh water.

The light was electrified in 1927, when the optic was replaced by a biform (i.e. two-tier) third-order sextuple-flashing rotating catadioptric optic, designed and built by Chance Brothers; the light had a range of 17 nmi (31 km; 20 mi) and displayed six quick flashes in 7.5 seconds. It was lit by two 3 kW filament lamps, one on each tier (the lower lamp was fitted to a turntable lamp changer, which automatically lit a standby lamp (either electric or acetylene) in the event of a bulb or power failure). At the same time a new diaphone fog signal was installed, sounding three blasts every 75 seconds.

In January 1959 the lighthouse was connected to mains electricity; the generator formerly in use was retained for emergency use. Some years afterwards the fog diaphone was replaced with an LIE300 electric horn.

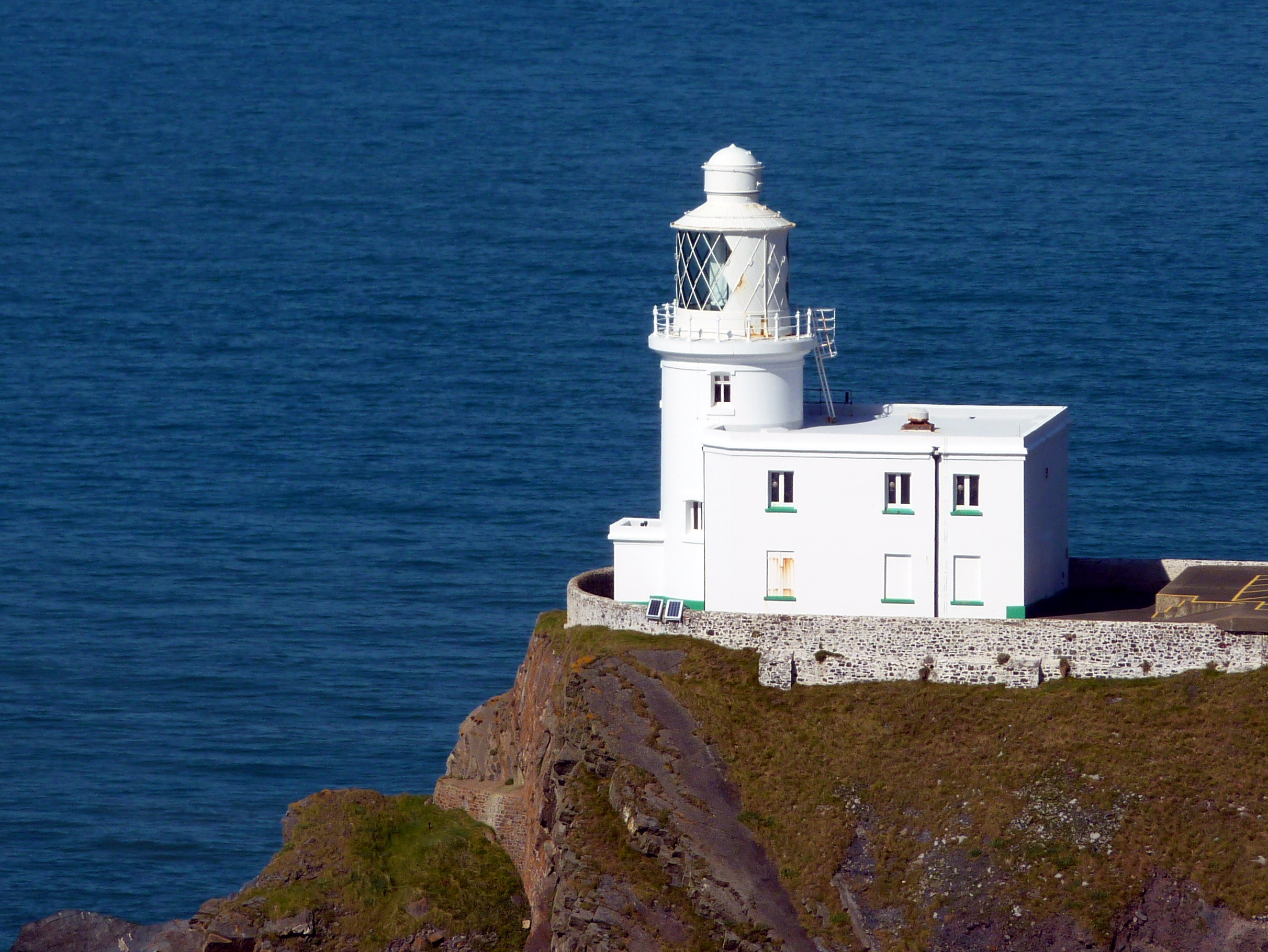
The lighthouse in 2012.

The tower was automated in 1984 and controlled from Trinity House Operations Centre at Harwich in Essex. The keepers' dwellings have since been demolished to make room for a Helipad to be constructed. This was necessary due to the precarious nature of the access road which is liable to frequent rock falls and landslips. Vehicular access is now very difficult and the gates tend to remain locked. The fog signal was discontinued in 2010.

Having carried out a thorough assessment of the requirements for Aids to Navigation off Hartland Point, Trinity House determined that the light at this location could be reduced to a nominal range of 8 nautical miles. This light can be more economically provided by a modern LED beacon in front of the original lighthouse, with no detriment to the safety of the Mariner. Consequently, the old light was decommissioned in 2012.

The Lighthouse was marketed and sold by Trinity House at a £500,000 guide price, consisting of "the former lighthouse, three bedroom living accommodation over two storeys, various stores, a helipad and access via a surfaced road that leads up the cliff to the gated entrance. The site in total amounts to about 16 acres of cliff and coastline, and has the best sea views in the area." In 2022 the unique biform optic was stolen: during restoration works it had been placed in a storage facility in Ilfracombe, after which it had been due to be reinstated in the tower; a reward was offered for its return.

== See also ==
- List of lighthouses in England
