= Hartland Point =

Headland on the north coast of Devon, England

Coordinates: 51°01′19″N 4°31′31″W

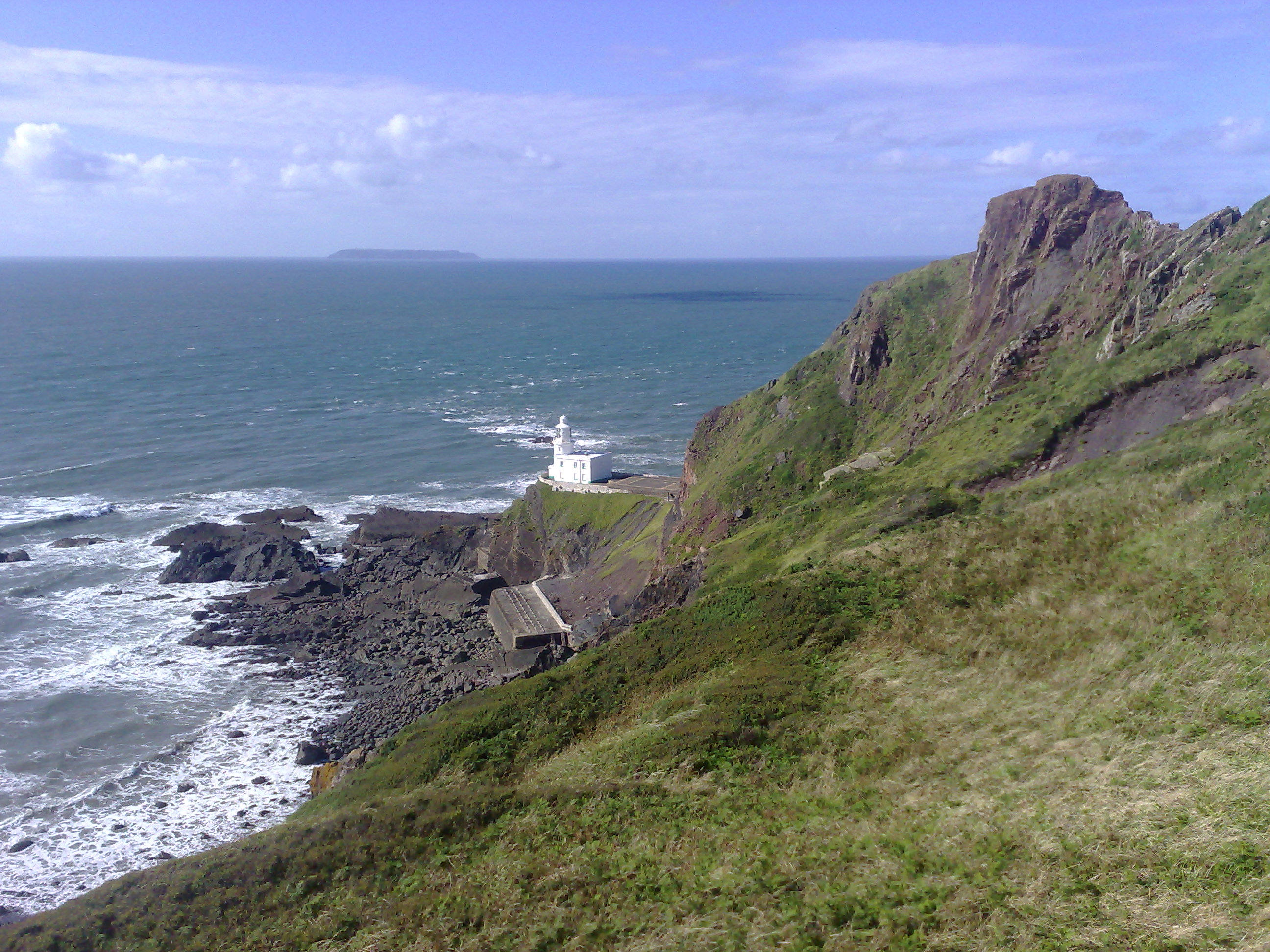
Hartland Point lighthouse. Lundy can be seen on the horizon

Hartland Point is a 325 ft (99 m) high rocky outcrop of land on the north-western tip of the Devon coast in England. It is three miles (5 km) north-west of the village of Hartland. The point marks the western limit (on the English side) of the Bristol Channel with the Atlantic Ocean continuing to the west. This location was known to the Romans as the "promontory of Hercules".

== Lighthouse ==
Trinity House, the lighthouse authority for England and Wales, has a lighthouse on the tip of the peninsula. The Hartland Point Lighthouse was built in 1874 under the direction of Sir James Douglass. The Grade II-listed tower is 18 metres (59 ft) tall with the lamp being 37 metres (121 ft) above mean sea level. The light could be seen up to 25 miles (40 km) away from the coast. It was blessed by Frederick Temple, Bishop of Exeter, who later became Archbishop of Canterbury. The tower was automated in 1984 and is now controlled from Trinity House Operations Centre at Harwich in Essex. Prior to automation, the lighthouse was built with accommodation for four keepers and their families. The keepers' dwellings have since been demolished to make room for a helipad to be constructed. This was necessary due to the precarious nature of the access road which is liable to frequent rock falls and landslips. Vehicular access is now very difficult and the gates tend to remain locked. The large concrete structures immediately to the south of the lighthouse provided the keepers with fresh water.

In its 2010 Aids to Navigation Review, Trinity House proposed to discontinue the Hartland Point Lighthouse Station on the grounds that Global Positioning Systems are superseding lighthouses as the most important navigation aids.

=== Characteristics ===
Light	White group flashing six times every fifteen seconds
Fog horn	One five-second blast every minute

== Coastguard ==
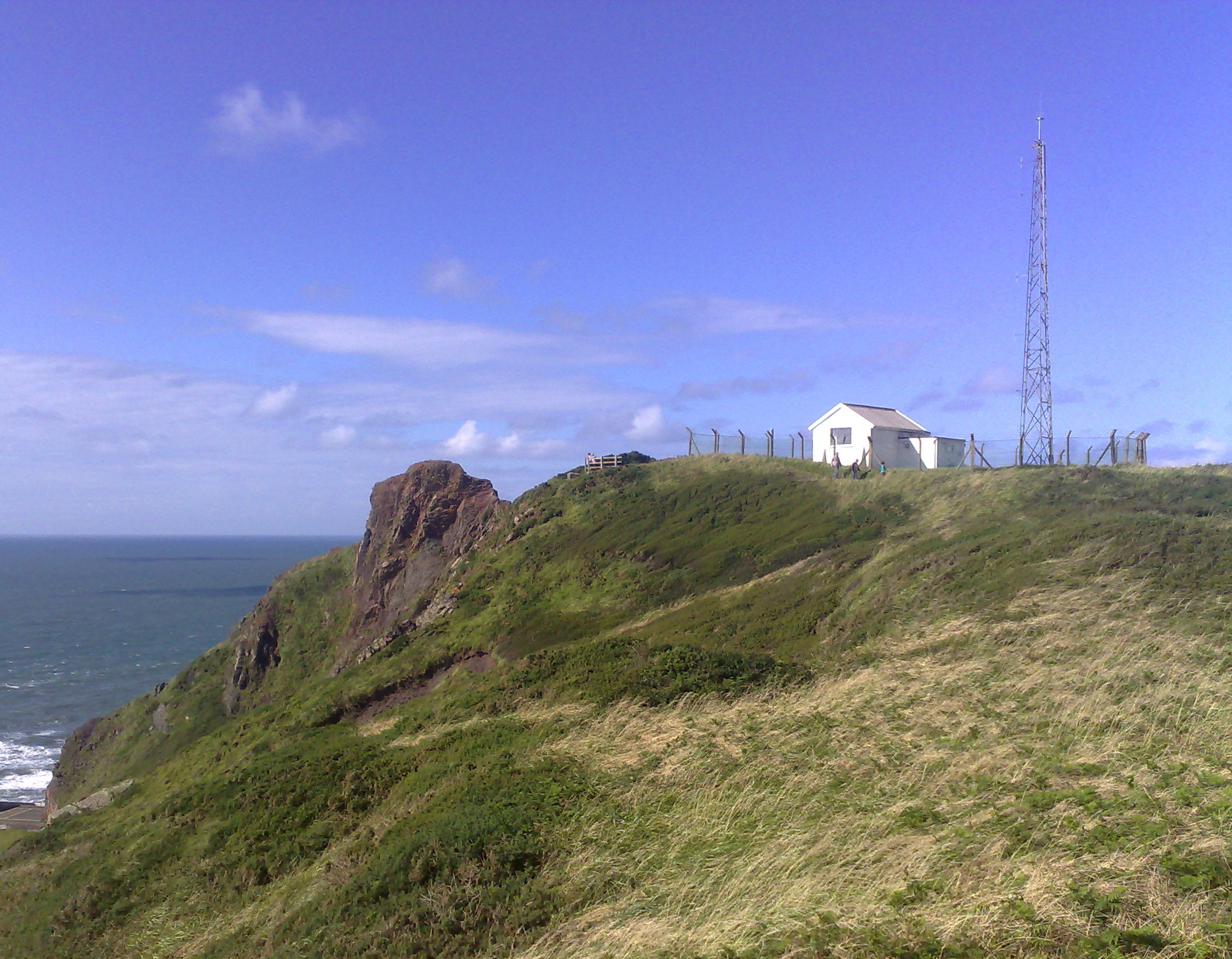
The coastguard station higher on the top of the point

HM Coastguard maintains a small station on the top of the point near the lighthouse. This is now normally unmanned.

The South West Coast Path was formerly an aid to the Coastguard who needed to be able to travel from station to station on foot while being able to keep an eye on the sea to spot for smugglers. The path stays close to the edge of the cliffs on its journey through Hartland Point and it is an ideal way to explore the point, its landmarks and the scenery.

== Radar Station ==
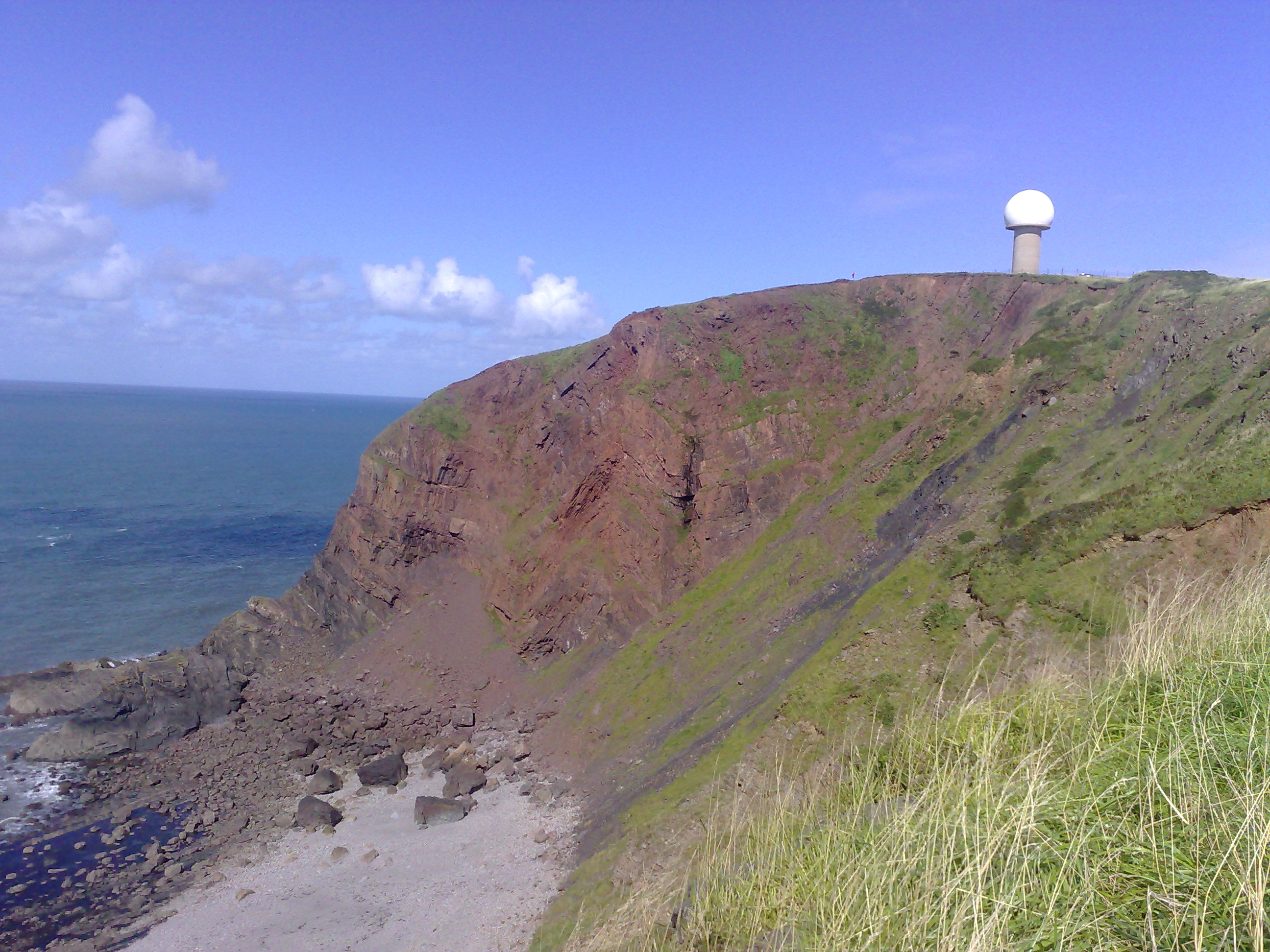
The radar perched on top of the cliff

The UK's Ministry of Defence previously had a radar installed on the point and controlled from nearby RNAS Yeovilton. The current radar is operated by the UK Civil Aviation Authority for air traffic control. This is used for air traffic control of both military and civilian aircraft. The unusual white-dome-topped structure can be seen from distances of up to 10 miles (16 km) from the point.

== MS Johanna ==
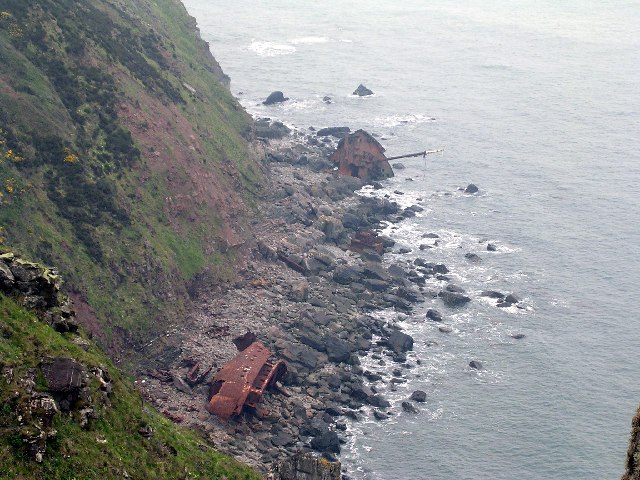
The remains of MS Johanna in 2004

On 31 December 1982 the Panama-registered, Dutch-owned MS Johanna was driven aground on rocks less than 400m from the lighthouse. The cargo ship was carrying wheat from the Netherlands up the Bristol Channel towards Cardiff. Four of the crew were rescued by a helicopter from RAF Chivenor in Devon. Three officers were taken off later in the day by the RNLI lifeboat from Clovelly. The decaying remains of the hull can still be seen.
