= St Bees Lighthouse =

Lighthouse at St Bees, Cumbria, England

St Bees Lighthouse North Head
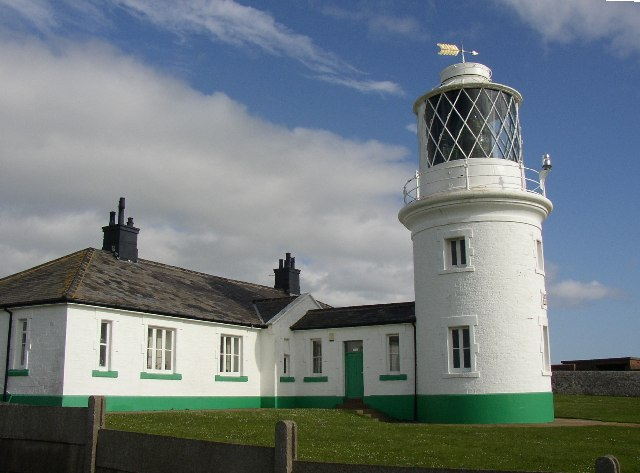
- St Bees Lighthouse
- Location: St Bees Head, Cumbria, England
- Coordinates: 54.513644°N 3.636739°W

Tower
- Constructed: 1718
- Construction: stone tower
- Automated: 1987
- Height: 17 m (56 ft)
- Shape: cylindrical tower with balcony and lantern
- Markings: white tower and lantern
- Power source: mains electricity
- Operator: Trinity House

Light
- First lit: 1867
- Focal height: 102 m (335 ft)
- Lens: 1st order 920 mm catadioptric
- Intensity: 60,000 candela
- Range: 18 nmi (33 km; 21 mi)
- Characteristic: Fl (2) W 20s.

St Bees Lighthouse is a lighthouse located on St Bees Head near the village of St Bees in Cumbria, England. The cliff-top light is the highest in England at 102 m (335 ft) above sea level.

== Earlier lighthouses ==
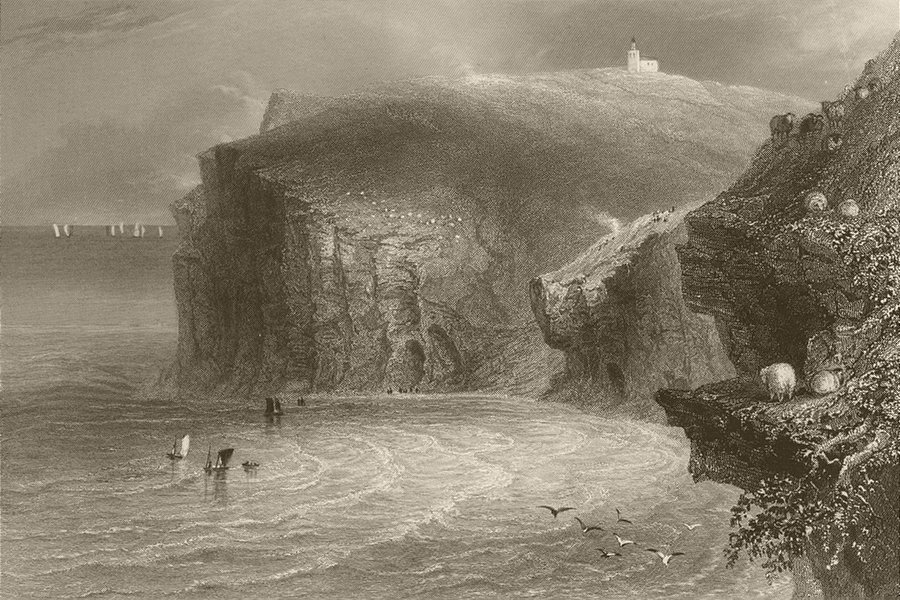
St Bees head and lighthouse, engraving 1842 by WH Bartlett

The first lighthouse on the site began its life in 1718 on land bought by Trinity House, one of the UK's general lighthouse authorities. It was constructed by Thomas Lutwi[d]ge, who paid a lease of £20 per year for the site. It stood 9 metres tall and was 5 metres in diameter topped with a large metal grate on which the lighthouse keeper would burn coal. To make money Lutwi[d]ge levied charges of 3½ pence per tonne of cargo carried by vessels to nearby ports.

In 1740 the Governors of St Bees School leased the lighthouse, with adjoining parcels of land. late in the tenure of Thomas Lutwidge, to Joseph Burrow of Whitehaven esquire for 5 guineas (£5, 5 shillings) at 1 shilling annual rent.

In 1822 it was the last coal-powered lighthouse in Britain, when it was destroyed by a fire in which the keeper's wife and five children perished by suffocation.

In its place a circular tower, 27 feet (8.2 m) high, with 15 oil-powered Argand lamps set within parabolic reflectors, was built by engineer Joseph Nelson at a cost of £1,447; it was operational from 1823.

In 1866 this was in turn replaced by a new, higher round tower, built (along with two new dwelling houses for the keepers) further inland.

== The current lighthouse ==
The foundation stone of the current tower was laid in a ceremony on 10 May 1865, with construction by builder John Glaister of Whitehaven. Civil engineer Henry Norris supervised the construction as resident engineer on behalf of Trinity House. Beneath the foundation stone a zinc box was laid containing a dated scroll signed by Henry Norris & John Glaister as well as by the others present at ceremony together with newspapers and coins of the realm.

The tower is 17 metres (56 ft) high and stands an average of 102 metres (335 ft) above sea level. It was built of local sandstone topped by a lantern that was originally destined for Gibraltar It was provided with a large (first-order) catadioptric optic, supplied by Chance Brothers & Co., with a single lamp, supplied by Messrs. W. Wilkins & Co. of Long Acre. The optic included a 'dioptric mirror' (i.e. a set of double-reflecting prisms) which redirected light from the landward side of the lamp back out to sea.

The new lighthouse was still under construction in late November 1866 when Henry Norris was sued by a painter in court in Whitehaven who had not been paid for lettering a notice board at the lighthouse; but it was operational by the end of the year. By the 1890s it was displaying a group-occulting light, on the following pattern: visible for 24 seconds, eclipsed for 2 seconds, visible for 2 seconds, eclipsed for 2 seconds; the light could be seen up to 24 nautical miles (44 km; 28 mi) out to sea.

In the 20th century, during the interwar period, the lighthouse was used as a turning marker in the London to Isle of Man air races. During World War II the local Home Guard used it to practice defence/attack strategies although there is no record of ammunition being fired at it. At Whitehaven Archives there is the Register of Reports on Supernumerary Assistant Keepers between 9 June 1925 and 14 May 1976 listing every keeper at the Light between those dates- too numerous to list here. A Chronological and name index has been compiled and appended to the Archive Catalogue Record. There is a list of keepers between 1841 and 1910 on GenUKI.

In 1951 the light was electrified and a new optic was installed. It retained a group-occulting characteristic until the 1960s, when it became a group-flashing light (flashing twice every twenty seconds).

In 1987 the lighthouse was de-staffed and automated: it became one of five to be remotely monitored from the Trinity House depot at Holyhead. At the same time the intensity of the light was reduced, giving a beam of 134,000 candela with a visible range of 18 nautical miles (33 km). In 1999 the light was further modernised (the lamp being replaced with a cluster of three 250W halogen lamps) after which it was monitored from the Trinity House Planning Centre in Harwich.

In February 2021 the (by then obsolescent) halogen lamps were removed and a new 90W LED light was installed (within the fresnel lens), which has succeeded in providing a more energy-efficient light source without any reduction in its range (18 Nautical Miles). It flashes twice every 20 seconds.

=== Fog signal ===
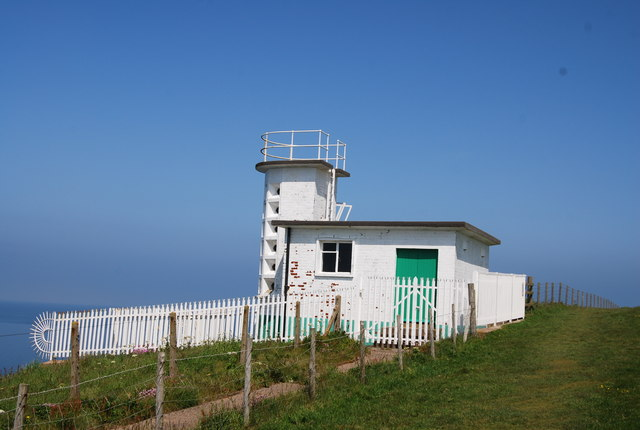
St Bees Fog Signal House on the cliff edge

From 1913 an explosive fog signal was sounded from the lighthouse; in conditions of poor visibility it was fired once every 5 minutes.

In 1964, the explosive signal was replaced with a triple-frequency electric fog signal, sounding two blasts every 45 seconds. It consisted of a stack of thirty Tannoy emitters powered by a pair of motor-driven alternators installed in a detached building very close to the edge of the cliff (150 yards in front of the lighthouse itself).

The fog signal was decommissioned in 1987.

== See also ==
- List of lighthouses in England
