= James Walker (engineer) =

British civil engineer

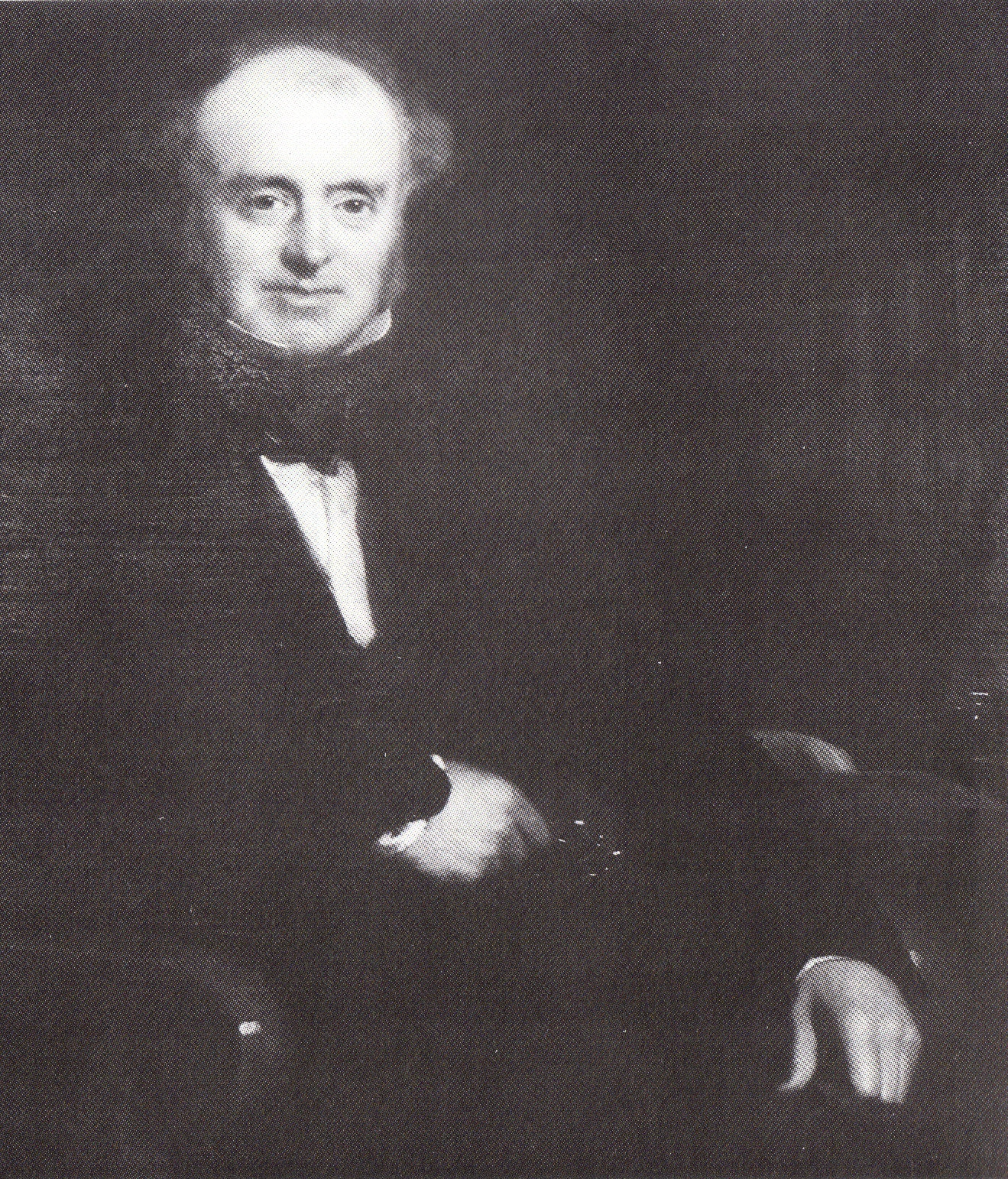
- James Walker
- Born: 14 September 1781; Falkirk, Scotland
- Died: 8 October 1862 (aged 81)
- Citizenship: United Kingdom
- Education: University of Glasgow
- Engineering career
- Discipline: civil engineering
- Institutions: Institution of Civil Engineers (president), Fellow of the Royal Society of Edinburgh, Fellow of the Royal Society of London
- Practice name: Walker & Burges

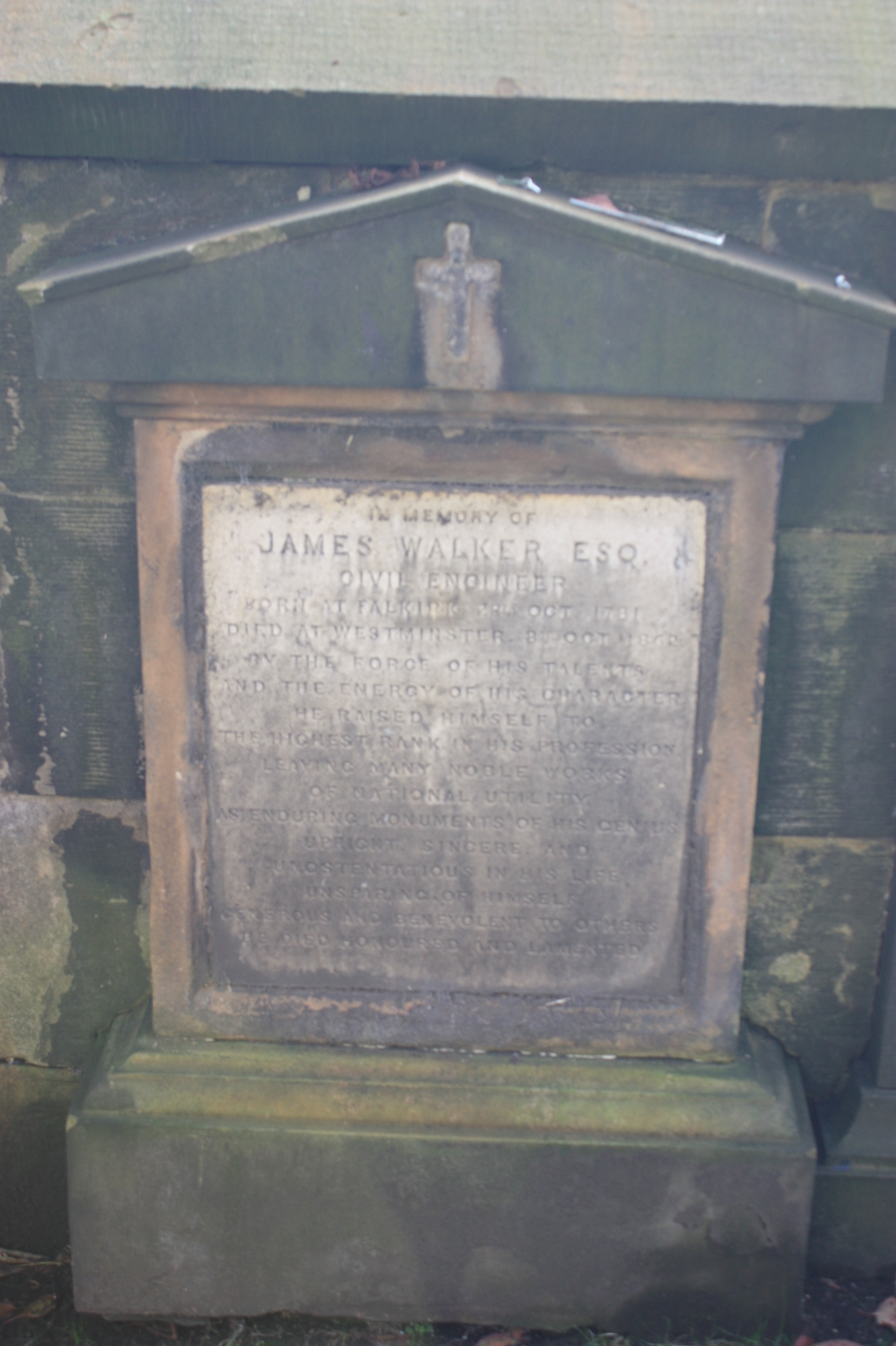
James Walker's grave, St Johns, Edinburgh

James Walker FRSE FRS FRSA (14 September 1781 – 8 October 1862) was a British civil engineer and contractor.

== Life ==
Born in Law Wynd in Falkirk, the eldest of five children of John Walker and his wife Margaret, James was educated at the local school and was sent to Glasgow University in October 1794, aged 13. He studied Latin and Greek for two years, and logic during his third year. During his final two years he studied natural philosophy and mathematics, taking the first prize.

He returned to Falkirk in May 1799, aged 18, and his family discussed a career in business or law. But, by chance, in the summer of 1800, he was asked to accompany his ill brother-in-law on a sea journey to London. Once there, he visited his uncle Ralph Walker in Blackwall, intending to return to Scotland after a week. However, Ralph discussed his work at the West India Docks, and was so impressed by his young nephew's grasp of engineering that he immediately took him on as his apprentice.

Around 1800 they worked on the design and construction of London's West India and East India Docks. At the age of 21 he took on his first engineering work in his own right: the construction of Commercial Road in London, connecting the West India Docks to the warehouses of the City. Later, he worked on the Surrey Commercial Docks from about 1810 onwards, remaining as engineer to the Surrey Commercial Dock Company until his death in 1862.

In 1821 Walker built his first lighthouse, the West Usk Lighthouse, near Newport, South Wales. He went on to build another 21 lighthouses.

Walker was the senior partner of the consulting engineering firm of Messrs. Walker and Burges (of Limehouse), Alfred Burges having first become his pupil in 1811 and risen to partner in 1829. In 1832 their offices moved to 44 Parliament Street, Westminster (which lies at southern end of Whitehall) and then to 23 George Street. In 1853 he promoted James Cooper, one of his assistants, to the partnership with the firm then being known as Messrs. Walker, Burges & Cooper.

Walker succeeded his associate Thomas Telford as President of the Institution of Civil Engineers, serving from 1834 to 1845. One of his first major roles as President was to oversee the choice of three new harbours to serve Edinburgh: a major extension to Leith Docks; a new harbour at Trinity; or a new harbour at Granton. The choice resulted in the building of Granton Harbour.

He was also chief engineer within Trinity House, hence his considerable involvement with coastal engineering and lighthouses. He was conferred with Honorary Membership of the Institution of Engineers and Shipbuilders in Scotland in 1857.

He died at 23 Great George Street in Westminster, London on 8 October 1862.

He is buried beneath a humble gravestone in St Johns churchyard in Edinburgh against a retaining wall on one of the southern terraces.

== Projects and other work ==
Walker worked on various engineering projects, including:

- Greenland Dock, London (c. 1808 – c. 1862)
- Vauxhall Bridge, London (1816, since demolished)
- Poplar Workhouse, London (c. 1815 – c. 1817), designer
- West Usk Lighthouse, near Newport, South Wales
- Survey for the Leeds and Selby Railway (1829)
- Brunswick Wharf Warehouse, Blackwall, London (1832–1834) designer, for the East India Dock Company and built by contractor Messrs. Horne & Gates of Poplar
- Survey for the Leipzig–Dresden Railway (1835)
- Hull and Selby Railway (survey and consulting engineer, 1834, 1836–1840).
- Start Point Lighthouse, Devon (1836)
- Maplin Sands Lighthouse (1838)
- Advice on alignment of Herefordshire and Gloucestershire Canal (1838)
- Victoria Viaduct (or Bridge) on the Durham Junction Railway (1838)
- Improvements to Aberdeen Harbour (1838)
- South Bishop Lighthouse (1839)
- Wolf Rock beacon and lighthouse (1840–1862)
- Coquet Lighthouse (1841)
- Plans for River Thames embankments, later known as 'Walker's lines,' upon which the present Thames and Victoria Embankments are largely based (c. 1842)
- South Foreland Lighthouse rebuilt with a taller tower (1841–1842)
- Trevose Head Lighthouse (1844–1847)
- River Severn and South Wales Railway (1845), a report that blocked Brunel's plans for railway bridges across the River Severn.
- Gunfleet Lighthouse, off Frinton-on-Sea, Essex (1850)
- Victoria Bridge, Glasgow (1851–1854)
- Design of the East Bute Dock, Cardiff (1855)
- Whitby Lighthouse - the twin lights of Whitby North and Whitby South lighthouses, near Ling Hill, High Whitby (1857–58)
- Bishop Rock Lighthouse (1858)
- Needles Lighthouse, Isle of Wight (1859)
- Completion of the Caledonian Canal (1838–1848)
- Alderney breakwater, Channel Islands (1847) and harbour (1862)
- St Catherine's Harbour, Jersey, Channel Islands (1847–1856)
- Improvements to navigation in the River Tyne (1853–1861)
- Houses of Parliament, consulting engineer for the Clock Tower (also known as Big Ben) as well as the Victoria Tower and Central Tower (1836–1859), cofferdam for the riverside foundations and terrace (1837–49)

Walker was also involved in designing a dock harbour in Hamburg (1845, with William Lindley and Heinrich Hübbe). He was also involved in the Liverpool and Manchester Railway, preparing a report on the merits of stationary and locomotive engines along with other notable engineers of the day. He was also for a long period consulting engineer to the Board of Admiralty.

== Memorial ==
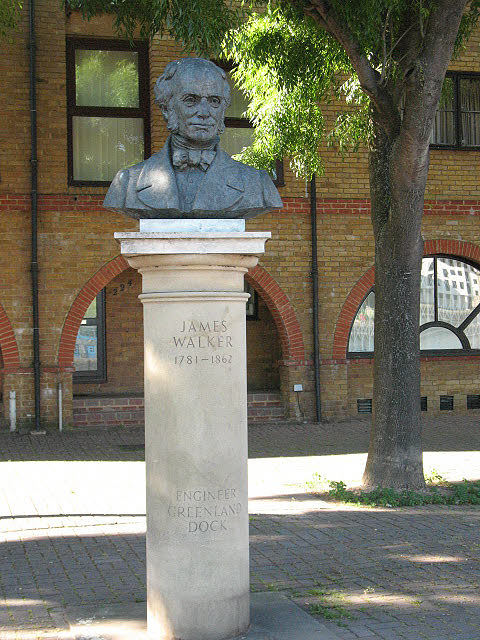
The Greenland Dock memorial

A memorial to Walker was commissioned by the Institution of Civil Engineers to stand at Greenland Dock and was unveiled in 1990.

Professional and academic associations
Preceded by Thomas Telford	President of the Institution of Civil Engineers; January 1835 – January 1845	Succeeded by John Rennie
