= North Foreland =

Chalk headland in Kent, England

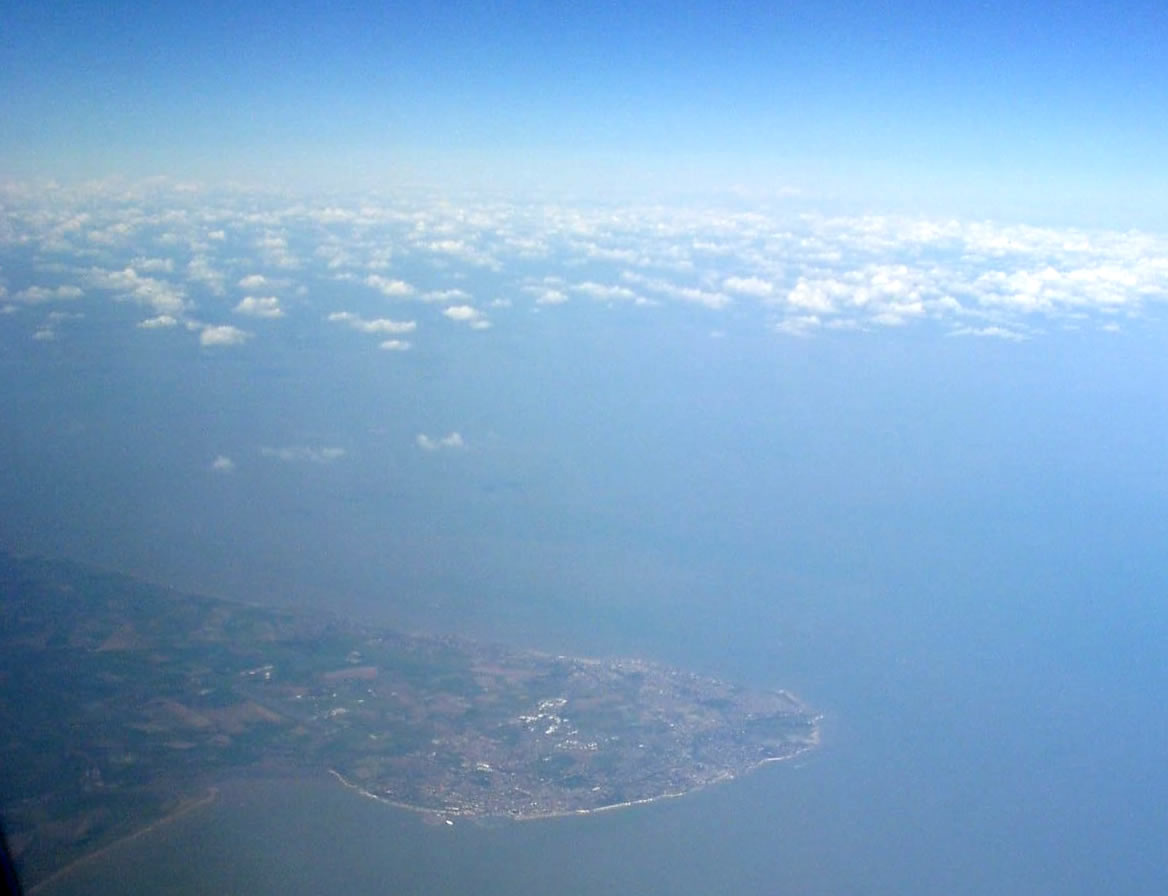
North Foreland is the eastern extremity of the Isle of Thanet

North Foreland is a chalk headland on the Kent coast of southeast England, specifically in Broadstairs.

With the rest of Broadstairs and part of Ramsgate it is the eastern side of Kent's largest peninsula, the Isle of Thanet. It presents a bold cliff to the sea, 15 miles north of South Foreland, and commands views over the southern North Sea.

LB&SCR H2 class 4-4-2 no. 422 (later no. B422, 2422, and 32422) was named North Foreland after this landmark.

== Lighthouse ==
North Foreland Lighthouse
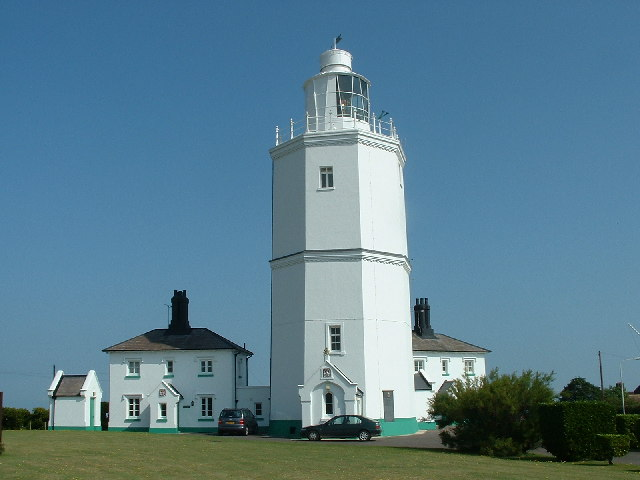
- North Foreland Lighthouse
- Location: Isle of Thanet, North Foreland, Broadstairs and St Peter's, United Kingdom
- OS grid: TR3985969619
- Coordinates: 51.37490°N 1.44510°E

Tower
- Constructed: 1636 (first)
- Construction: stone tower
- Automated: 1998
- Height: 26 m (85 ft)
- Shape: octagonal tower with balcony and lantern attaches to a 2-storey keeper's house
- Markings: white tower and lantern
- Operator: Trinity House
- Heritage: Grade II listed building

Light
- First lit: 1691 (current)
- Focal height: 57 m (187 ft)
- Lens: 1st order catadioptric fixed lens
- Light source: 4x 230 V 500 W halogen lamps
- Intensity: 60,800 candela
- Range: 19 nmi (35 km; 22 mi)
- Characteristic: Fl (5) RW 20s.

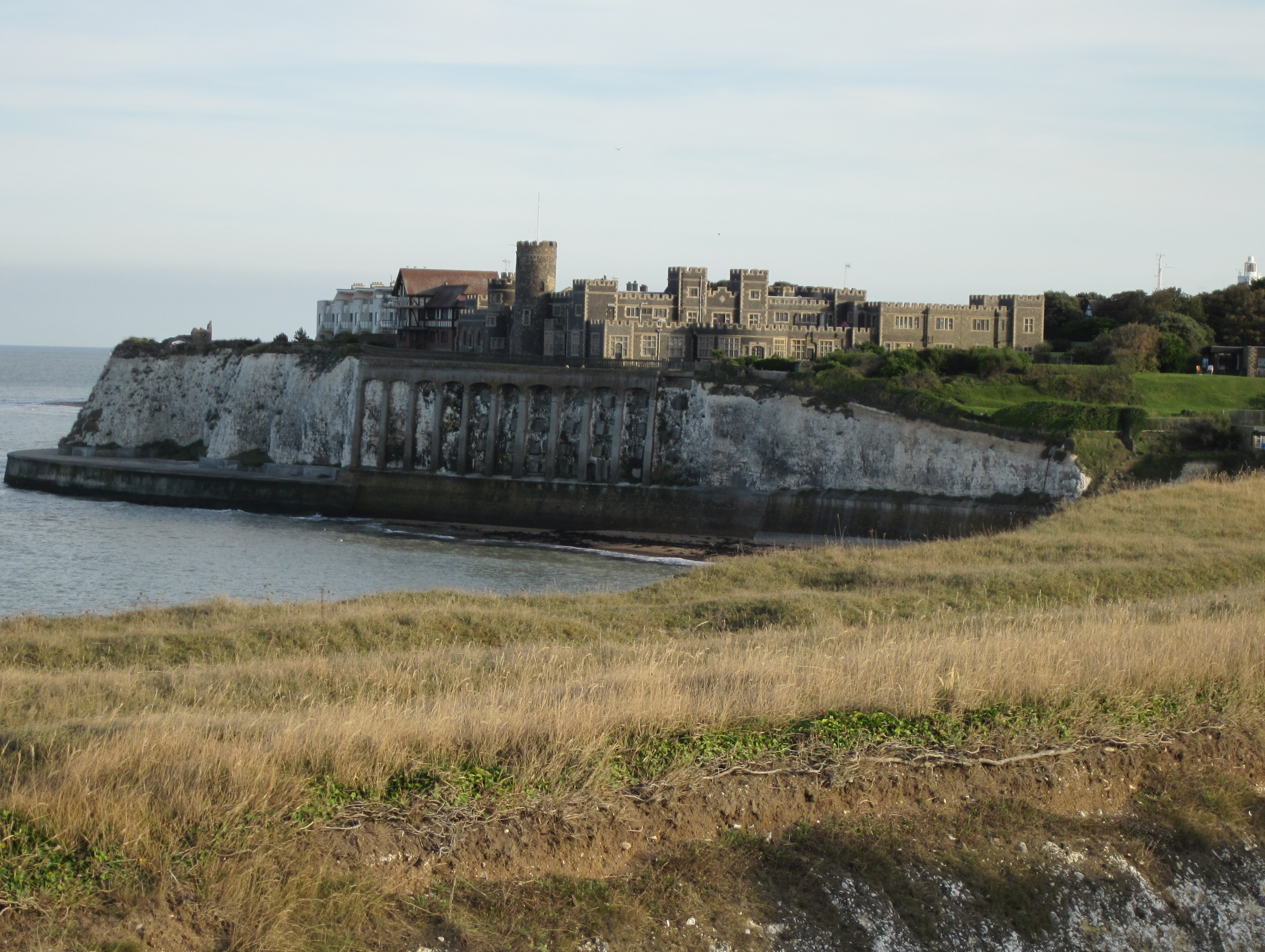
North Foreland lighthouse is visible on the right of the photo of Kingsgate Castle.

=== Early history ===
There was probably some sort of a beacon at an earlier period but the first distinct intimation concerning a lighthouse on the North Foreland is in the year 1636 when Charles I by letters-patent granted to Sir John Meldrum licence to continue and renew the lighthouses erected on the North and South Forelands.

It seems that the lighthouse erected by Sir John consisted merely of a house built with timber lath and plaster on the top of which a light was kept in a large glass lantern for the purpose of directing ships in their course. This house was burnt down by accident in the year 1683 after which for some years use was made of a sort of beacon on which a light was hoisted. But near the end of the same century a strong octagonal structure of flint was erected on the top of which was an iron grate quite open to the air in which a good fire of coals was kept blazing at night. In 1719 ownership of both the North and South Foreland lights passed by will to the Trustees of Greenwich Hospital.

=== 18th century ===
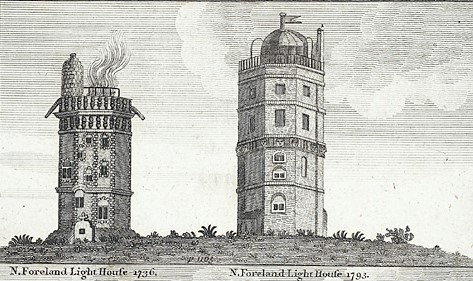
Comparative view: North Foreland Lighthouse in 1736 and in 1793.

About the year 1732 the top of this lighthouse was covered with a sort of lantern with large sash windows, and the fire was kept bright by bellows with which the attendants blew throughout the night. This contrivance is said to have been for the purpose of saving coals but it would seem more probable that it was in order to preserve the fire from being extinguished by rain. However the plan did not work well and great injury resulted to navigation as many vessels were lost on the sands from not seeing the light, and so little was it visible at sea that mariners asserted that they had often in hazy weather seen the Foreland before they could discover the light. They added that before the lantern was placed there and when the fire was kept in the open air the wind kept the fire in a constant blaze which was seen in the air far above the lighthouse. Complaints of this sort were so loud and frequent that the governors of Greenwich Hospital sent Sir John Thomson to examine and make arrangements on the subject. He ordered the lantern to be taken away and things to be restored to nearly their former state, with the light to continue burning all the night until daylight.

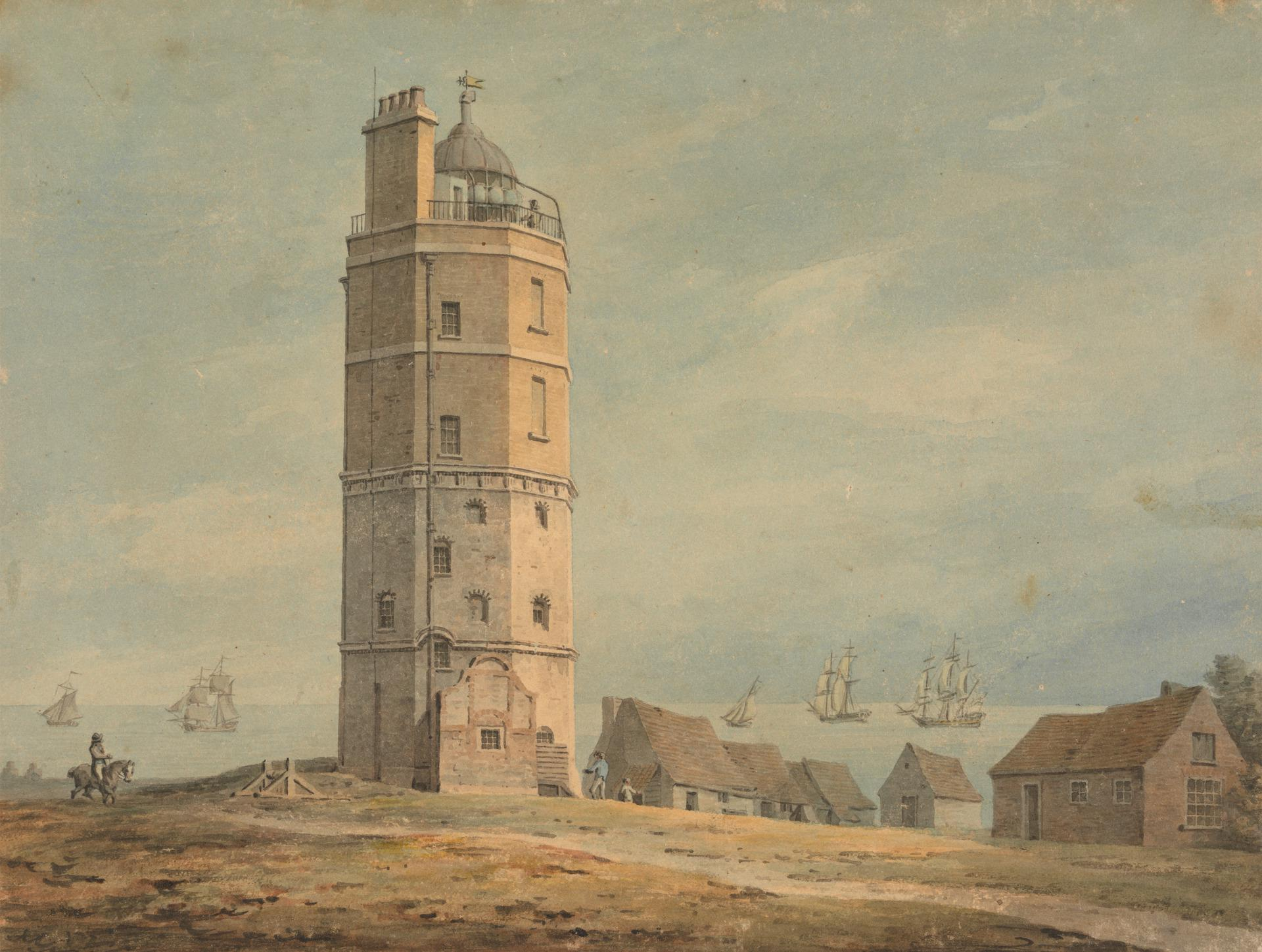
The lighthouse in the 1790s (with convex lenses on the lantern).

Towards the end of the 18th century the North Foreland Lighthouse underwent some considerable alterations and repairs. In 1792, under the supervision of John Yenn (Surveyor to Greenwich Hospital), two stories of brick were built on the original structure which raised it to the height of 100 feet including the lantern room at the top in which the lights were kept. (To prevent accidents from fire the lantern room was coated with copper as was also the gallery around it; this gallery used to be much frequented by the visitors to Margate on account of the extensive views.) At the same time oil lamps were installed in the tower, together with a new optical system designed by Thomas Rogers (who had previously installed a similar system in the lower lighthouse at Portland): it consisted of two rows of nine lamps and reflectors arranged in a convex curve, placed behind a row of solid glass convex lenses which were incorporated within the glazing around the lantern room.

=== 19th century ===
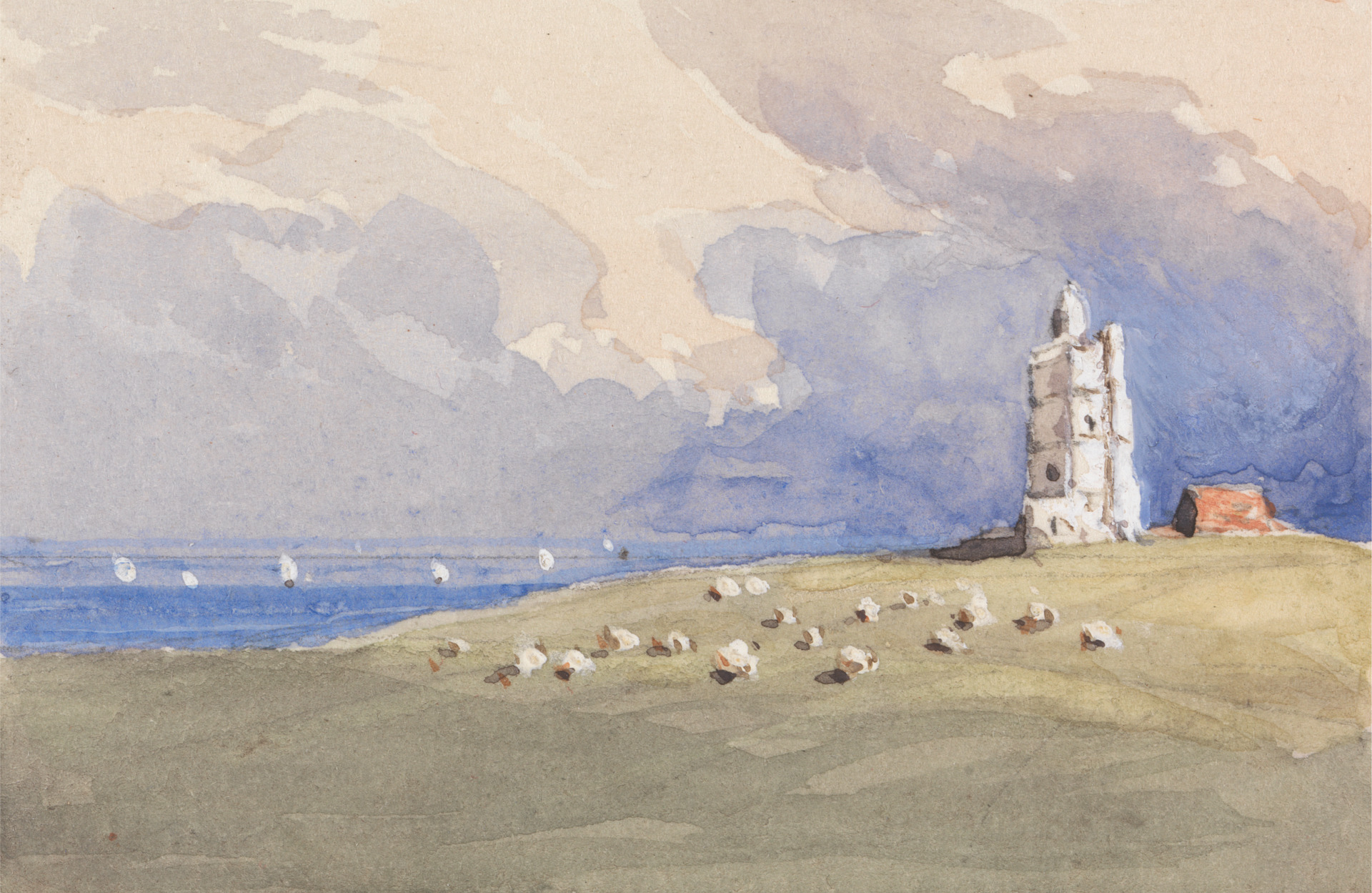
North Foreland Lighthouse by George Jackson, ca. 1839–1844

In 1832 Trinity House purchased the North and South Foreland lighthouses from Greenwich Hospital and two years later the lenses were removed. 1858 saw the construction of a new lantern atop the lighthouse: '14 feet wide and 22 feet from the floor to the apex of the roof. It is sixteen-sided with diagonal astragals'. In it, under the supervision of engineer Henry Norris, a new multi-wick oil burner was installed together with a large (first-order) fixed catadioptric optic manufactured by Sautter & Co. of Paris (replacing the previous catoptric apparatus of 18 Argand lamps & reflectors); it was first lit on 26 March 1860. Three months later a red sector was added to the light, which shone northwards 'to enable vessels at night to keep to the eastward of Margate Sand'. (These works coincided with the successful experiments carried out in 1857–60 at the South Foreland lighthouse by Professor Frederick Hale Holmes with an alternating current electric arc light).

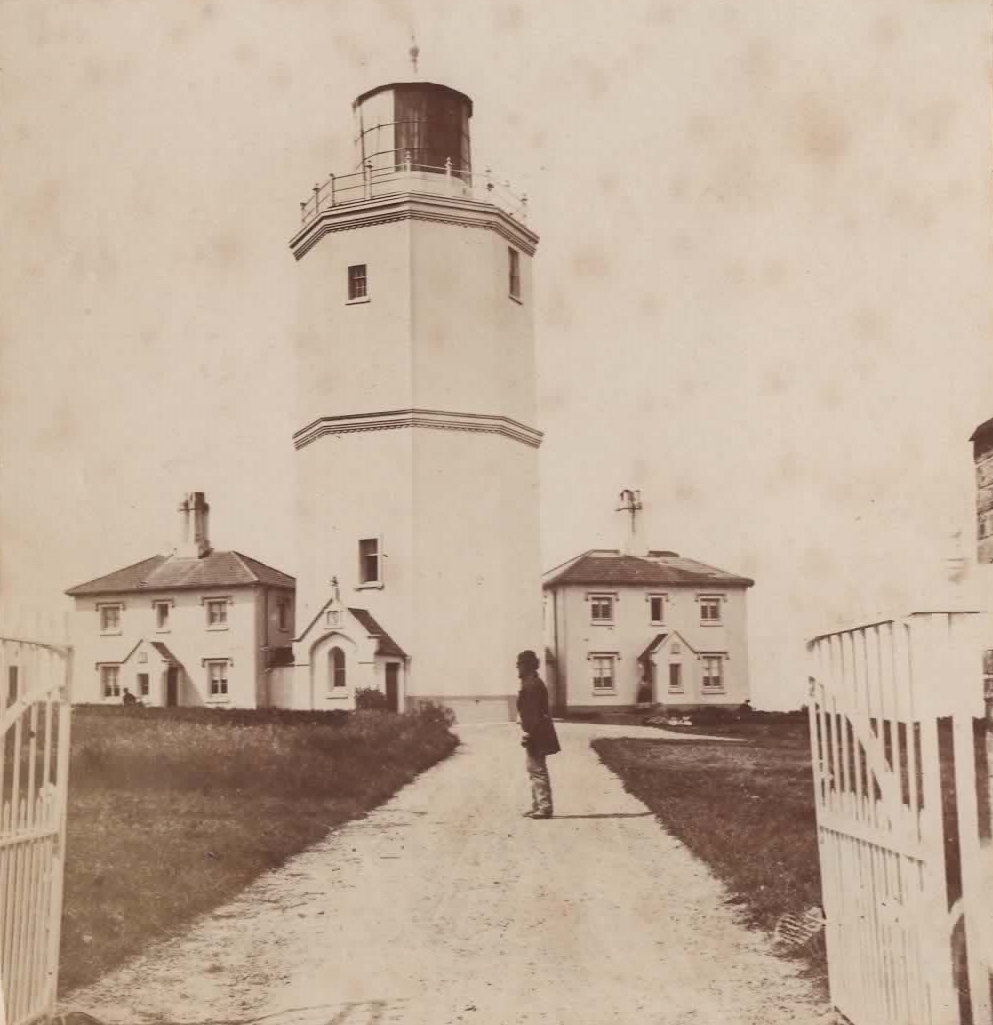
North Foreland lighthouse in about 1880, showing the keepers' cottages and the modernised tower and lantern.

At the same time the tower itself was modernised: two keepers' cottages were built alongside and the interior of the tower (which had previously contained rooms on several storeys) was completely gutted. An inner circular brick wall was then constructed, which supported a new cantilevered stone staircase leading from ground level to the service room, immediately below the lantern. Most of the exterior windows were blocked at this time, and the exterior of the tower was rendered and painted white. This work was completed in 1866, leaving the lighthouse looking much the same as it does today.

In 1880 the light characteristic was changed from fixed to occulting (being eclipsed for five seconds every half minute). The light was further improved in 1894 when a Trinity House-pattern eight-wick heavy mineral oil burner was installed in place of the old oil lamp.

=== 20th century ===
The lamp continued to be upgraded through the first part of the twentieth century: a triple mantle burner was installed in 1904, and its place was taken by a ‘Hood’ 100mm petroleum vapour burner in 1923. Then in 1930 the light was electrified, and at the same time given the light characteristic of five flashes every twenty seconds, which it retains to the present day. The fixed optic of 1860 continued in use, so the lamp itself was made to flash (rather than this being effected by the rotation of a lens). The light source was a tungsten filament lamp (with an identical lamp being provided as a standby along with an acetylene lamp for emergencies, all three mounted on an automatic lamp changer). Also in 1930 a radio beacon was established at North Foreland.

During the Second World War a number of radar stations were set up by German forces in France and the Netherlands to detect allied aircraft flying across the English Channel and a chain of top secret radar jamming stations were set up by British scientists along the south east coast of Britain. An array of transmitters was set out around the gallery of the lighthouse controlled by equipment in the lower lantern as part of this chain.

By the late 1980s North Foreland Lighthouse was operating as an area control station, with an augmented crew of keepers monitoring (in addition to North Foreland itself) eleven other major aids to navigation (including light vessels in the Dover Strait and the lighthouses at Dungeness and Beachy Head).

North Foreland lighthouse was the last Trinity House manned lighthouse in the UK but was automated in a ceremony presided over by the Duke of Edinburgh in 1998. Dermot Cronin and Tony Homewood were the last Principal Lighthouse Keepers that manned North Foreland lighthouse. The actual last manned lighthouse, owned by the Lancaster Port Commission was Walney Light, automated in 2003.

=== Present day ===
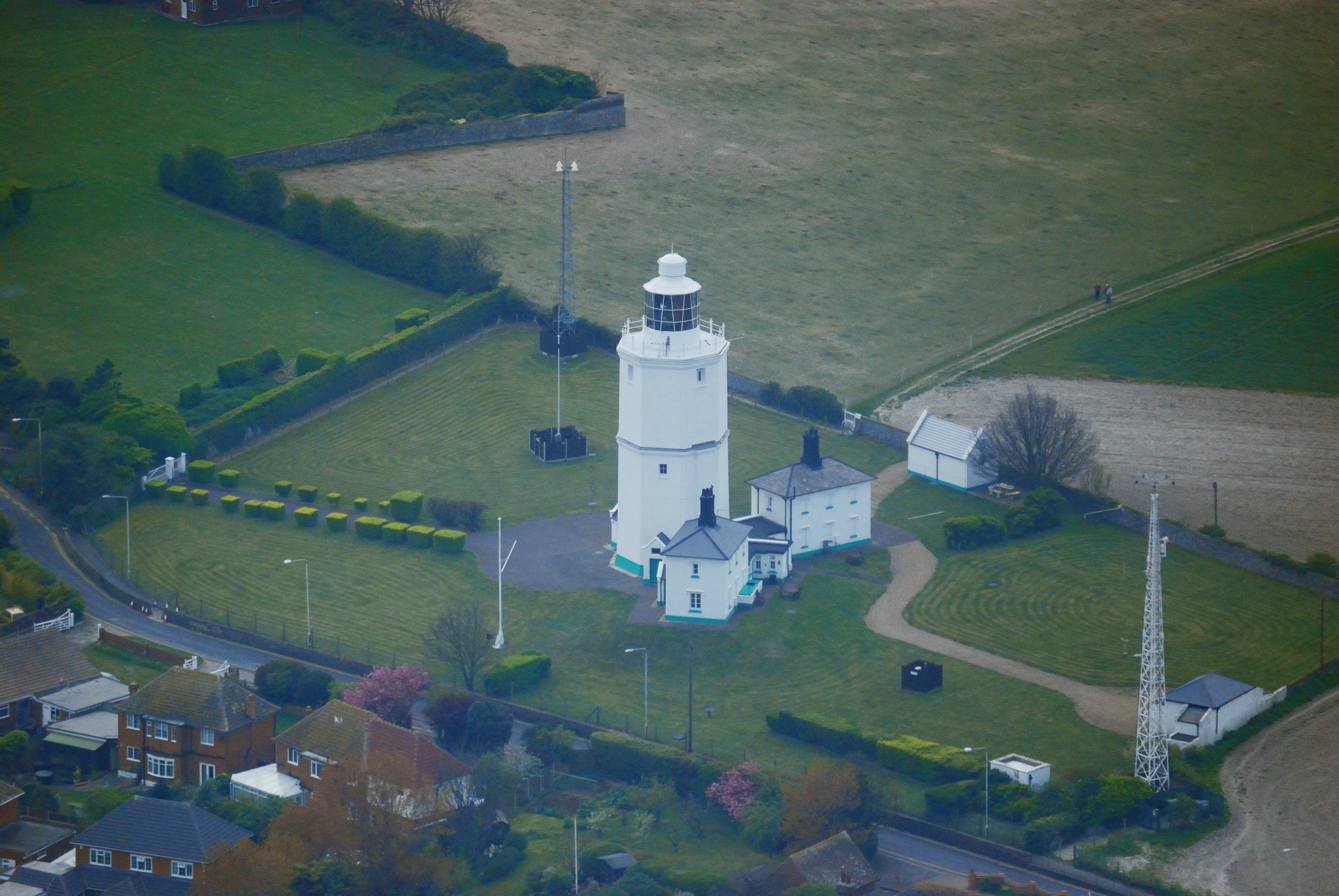
An aerial view of the lighthouse.

The lighthouse remains operational and is monitored and controlled by Trinity House from its Planning Centre at Harwich. The 1860 optic is still in use with a modern light source displaying a group-flashing characteristic.

A painting of the lighthouse by Elwin Hawthorne is in the Russell-Cotes Art Gallery & Museum in Bournemouth.

Currently, the cottages around the lighthouse can be rented as holiday accommodation. In electoral wards as most often drawn, postally as to post town and in the Church of England it remains part of Broadstairs.

== Battles ==
Two naval battles of the Anglo-Dutch Wars are called the Battle of the North Foreland after the cape:

- The Battle of the Gabbard, 2–3 June 1653, in the First Anglo-Dutch War.
- The St. James's Day Battle, 25–26 July 1666, in the Second Anglo-Dutch War.

== Radio station ==
A coastal radio station was established adjacent to the light house in 1901. Its call sign was 'GNF'. The transmitting function was later moved about a mile inland, although the medium wave receiving aerial remained operational until closure in 1991.

== See also ==
- List of lighthouses in England
