= Dungeness Lighthouse =

Lighthouse in Kent, England

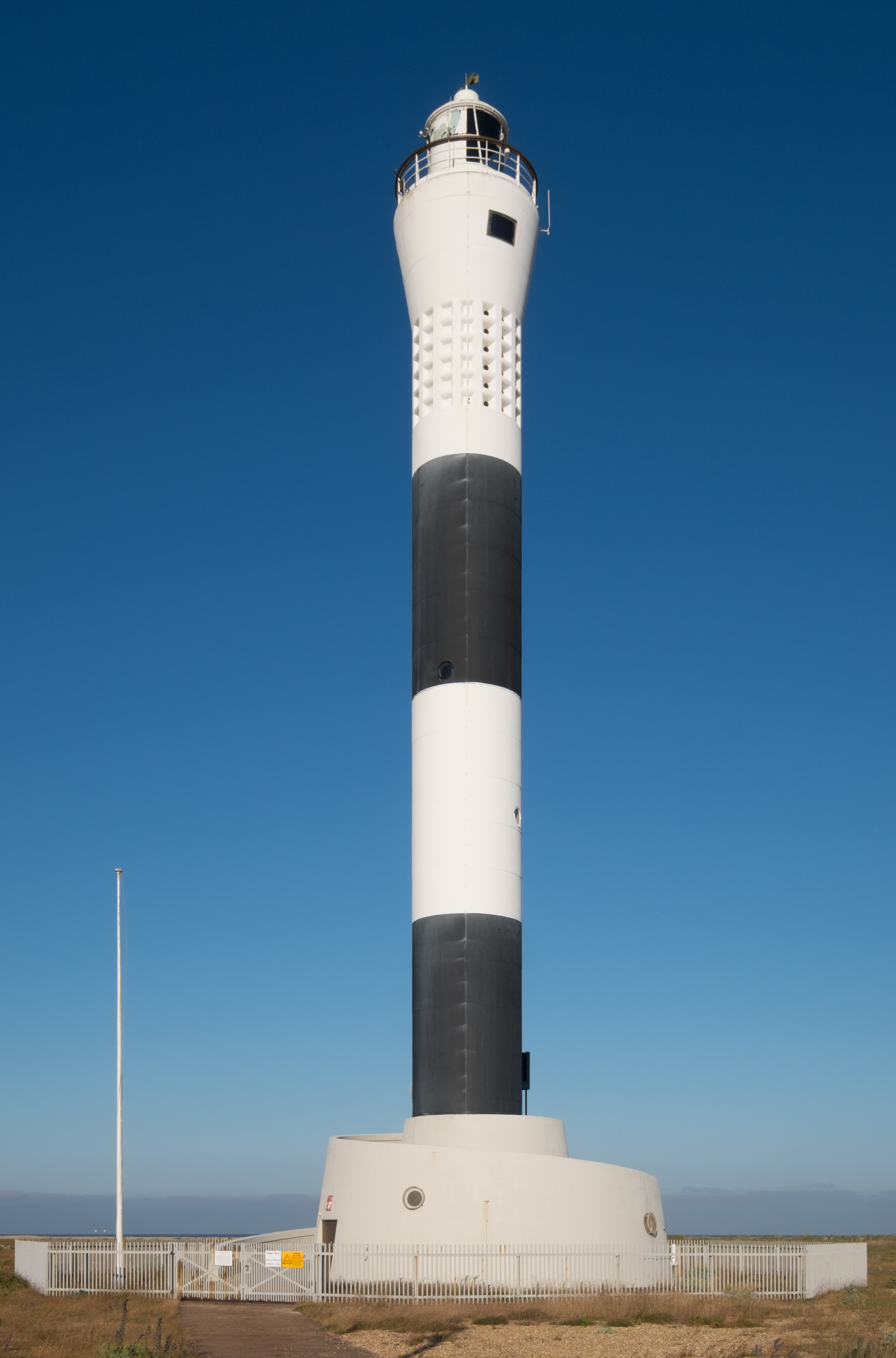
- The current (1961) lighthouse
- Location: Dungeness; Kent; England
- OS grid: TR0929316882
- Coordinates: 50°54′48.5″N 0°58′33.6″E

Tower
- Constructed: 1615 (first); 1635 (second); 1792 (third); 1904 (fourth)
- Construction: concrete tower
- Automated: 1991
- Height: 43 m (141 ft)
- Shape: cylindrical tower flared at the top with balcony and lantern
- Markings: tower with black and white bands, white lantern
- Operator: Trinity House
- Heritage: Grade II* listed building
- Fog signal: 1 blast every 30s.

Light
- First lit: 1961 (current)
- Focal height: 40 m (130 ft)
- Lens: 4th order catadioptric four panel rotating
- Intensity: 134,000 Candela
- Range: 21 nmi (39 km)
- Characteristic: Fl W 10s.

Dungeness Lighthouse on the Dungeness Headland started operation on 20 November 1961. Its construction was prompted by the building of Dungeness nuclear power station, which obscured the light of its predecessor (dating from 1904) which, though decommissioned, remains standing. The new lighthouse (the fifth on the site) is constructed of precast concrete rings; its pattern of black and white bands is impregnated into the concrete. It remains in use today, monitored and controlled from the Trinity House Operations and Planning Centre at Harwich, Essex.

== History ==
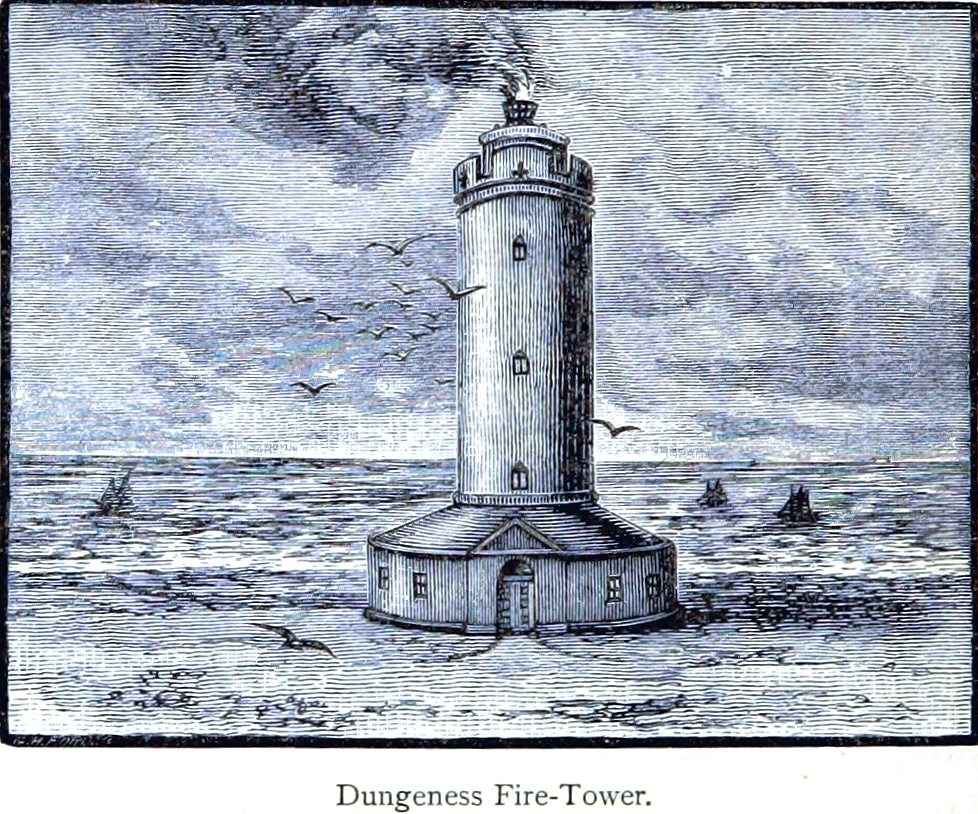
An image of the second lighthouse, in service until 1792.

In all there have been eight lighthouses at Dungeness: five main (or 'high') lights (of which the fifth is still fully operational today), and three subsidiary (or 'low') lights. The addition of a subsidiary light became necessary owing to the constant accretion of shingle on the east side of the spit (an ongoing problem on this cuspate foreland), which gradually leaves each lighthouse at an ever-increasing distance from the sea on that side. In the nineteenth and twentieth centuries Dungeness was used as an experimental station by Trinity House; in the 1860s it was the first of their lighthouses to be equipped with a fog horn and the first to be given a permanent (if short-lived) electric lamp.

=== The early lights ===
At first only a beacon was used to warn sailors, but this was replaced by a proper lighthouse in 1615. As the sea retreated, this had to be replaced in 1635 by a new lighthouse nearer to the water's edge known as Lamplough's Tower.

=== Wyatt's tower ===
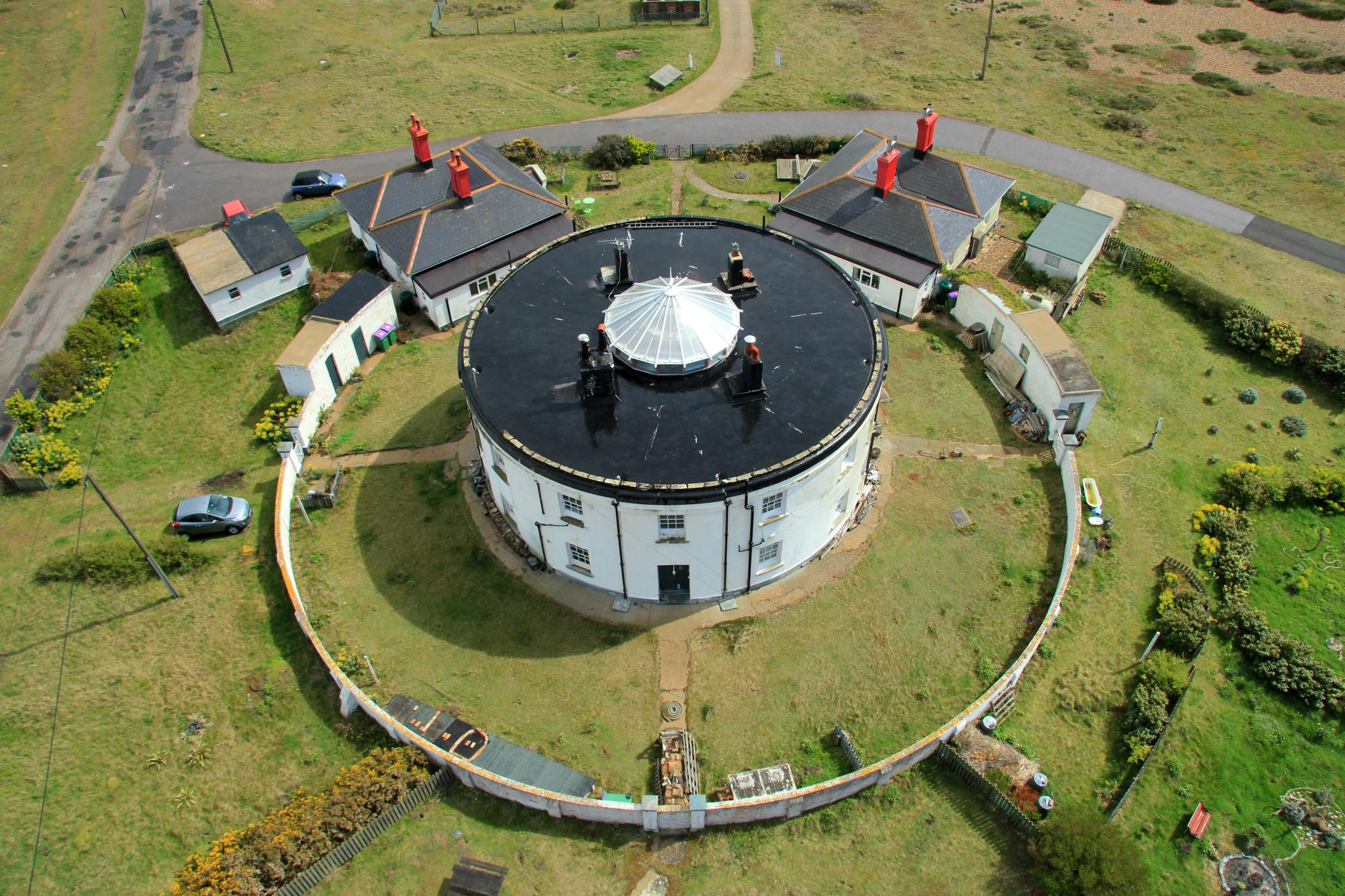
Keepers' dwellings on the site of Wyatt's tower

As more shingle was thrown up, a new and more up-to-date lighthouse was built near the sea in 1792 by Samuel Wyatt for Thomas William Coke (who held the patent for the lighthouse whereby and he received the dues and had responsibility for maintaining the light). This lighthouse was about 35 m (115 ft) high and of the same design as the third Eddystone Lighthouse. It was lit using a fixed array of eighteen Argand lamps and parabolic reflectors.

In 1837 the Corporation of Trinity House purchased the remaining portion of the lease for the sum of £20,954. Not long afterwards, in 1843, they built the lighthouse keepers' dwellings encircling the base of the tower. The tower was painted red to make it more visible in daylight; from 1865 it had alternating red and white horizontal bands. In September 1866, red sectors were added to the main light, to indicate anchorages in the bays to either side of Dungeness Point.

==== Electric light ====
In the early 1860s, Dungeness was chosen by Michael Faraday (scientific adviser to Trinity House) to be the first lighthouse to receive a permanent electric light installation. (One had previously been installed at South Foreland Lighthouse, but only on a temporary and experimental basis.) Two carbon arc lamps were installed (one as a standby), each placed within a small (sixth-order) lens, provided by Chance & Co., backed by a silvered reflector. They were placed above the oil lamps and reflectors, which were retained as an emergency backup. The Holmes magneto-electric machines from South Foreland were installed in a room at the base of the tower, along with their steam engines and other equipment, and the new light came into operation on 1 February 1862. Unfortunately it did not prove as reliable or economical as might have been hoped: the engines regularly broke down (leading to the oil lamps being brought into use on multiple occasions); and due to the small size of the optic, sparking from the arc lamp damaged the lenses and eventually rendered them unusable. They were eventually replaced with a larger, third-order lens (which had been built by Chance for the 1867 Paris Exhibition, and subsequently used for experiments at Blackwall).

In 1865, an official Trinity House review of the electrical installation at Dungeness conceded that 'the results have not been commensurate with the cost'. Nevertheless, the Elder Brethren maintained that electricity 'may still become a most valuable element in lighthouse illumination in some few special cases; but to enable it to become so, or to give a fair estimate of its powers, it must be exhibited under entirely changed conditions from those which now exist'. Lessons learned from the difficulties with electric light at Dungeness led to far more reliable systems being installed in 1871 at Souter Point (the first purpose-built electrically lit lighthouse) and in 1872 at South Foreland. Costs were also progressively reduced: the operating cost per unit of light of the electric system installed at the Lizard Lighthouses in 1874 was one ninth that of Dungeness.

Later the electric light at Dungeness began to function more reliably; but one problem had emerged which was not easily solved: the relatively low level of the tower in relation to the sea meant that ships' crews were dazzled by the intense light, especially when sailing close to shore. The progressive accretion of shingle to the spit only exacerbated the problem, which is what ultimately led to the electric installation being decommissioned. The carbon arc lamp remained in use at Dungeness until 1 October 1875, when the lighthouse was instead fitted with a multi-wick oil lamp together with a new fixed first order Fresnel lens. (The lens was designed so that light from the landward side (which would otherwise be wasted) was reflected through condensing prisms to intensify the red-coloured sectors.) These changes coincided with the commissioning of a new 'Low Lighthouse' (see below), designed to supplement the 'High' Lighthouse (the sea having receded from its position).

==== Demolition ====
By the end of the century, with the sea continuing to recede, the decision was taken to build a new High lighthouse. Once this new light had been lit, Wyatt's tower was demolished in 1904; but the lighthouse keepers' accommodation, built in a circle around the base of the tower, still exists.

=== Early fog signals and the first Low Light ===
In 1862 the American entrepreneur and inventor Celadon Daboll demonstrated his eponymous trumpet (an early reed fog horn) to the Elder Brethren of Trinity House at Dungeness; practical comparison was made with a bell and a 'steam-horn', each being sounded in turn. The initiative was successful and the following year he took out a patent on the use of compressed air horns in Britain (having taken out a similar patent in the U.S.A. three years earlier). The horn installed for the demonstration was subsequently purchased by the Treasury and retained for use as the fog signal at Dungeness; it sounded, once every 20 seconds, from a horizontal trumpet protruding from a small wooden building close to the shore, which contained a caloric engine and other associated equipment. It remained in use until 1865, when it was 'considerably damaged by an accidental fire'; (it was subsequently repaired and transferred to the Newarp Lightvessel).

In its place, that same year, an improved Daboll trumpet (twice the length of its predecessor, at 9 ft (2.7 m)) was installed in a new building at Dungeness; this was the first time Trinity House had installed a fog horn at any of its lighthouses. The new trumpet was designed to rotate automatically through a 210° horizontal arc, so as to sound in four different directions within the space of a minute. Compressed air was provided by a pair of Ericsson hot air engines.

In 1875 a new fog signal was installed at Dungeness: an early American siren (it was almost certainly the one which had been demonstrated by Joseph Henry in the trials at South Foreland Lighthouse two years earlier). It was housed in a new, corrugated iron building, placed as close as possible to the eastern edge of the spit, from the end wall of which protruded a long trumpet supported on a timber framework. It sounded one blast every minute.

==== 1st Low Light ====
At the same time, attached to the fog signal house, a new 'Low Lighthouse' was established, designed to supplement the High light (which was now some distance from the shore): it was a short metal tower with an octagonal lantern, and stood, along with the fog signal, 225 yards (206 m) from the main lighthouse. Oil-fuelled, with a focal height of 28 ft (8.5 m) and a range of 10 nmi (19 km; 12 mi), it was equipped with a two-wick Douglass burner and a 12-sided fourth-order revolving optic, which displayed a quick white flash every five seconds; (this was in contrast to the fixed light shown from the high lighthouse). It was lit from 1 October 1875, coinciding with the conversion of the High Light from electricity back to oil.

In 1877 the fog signal was altered to sound two blasts every two minutes; then, in 1881, it was modified so as to sound a two-tone signal (a high note followed by a low note) every two minutes. By 1895 the engine house contained a 6hp Priestman Oil Engine, in addition to the two hot air engines; it drove a double-acting Johnson air compressor.

=== The fourth ('Old') Lighthouse ===
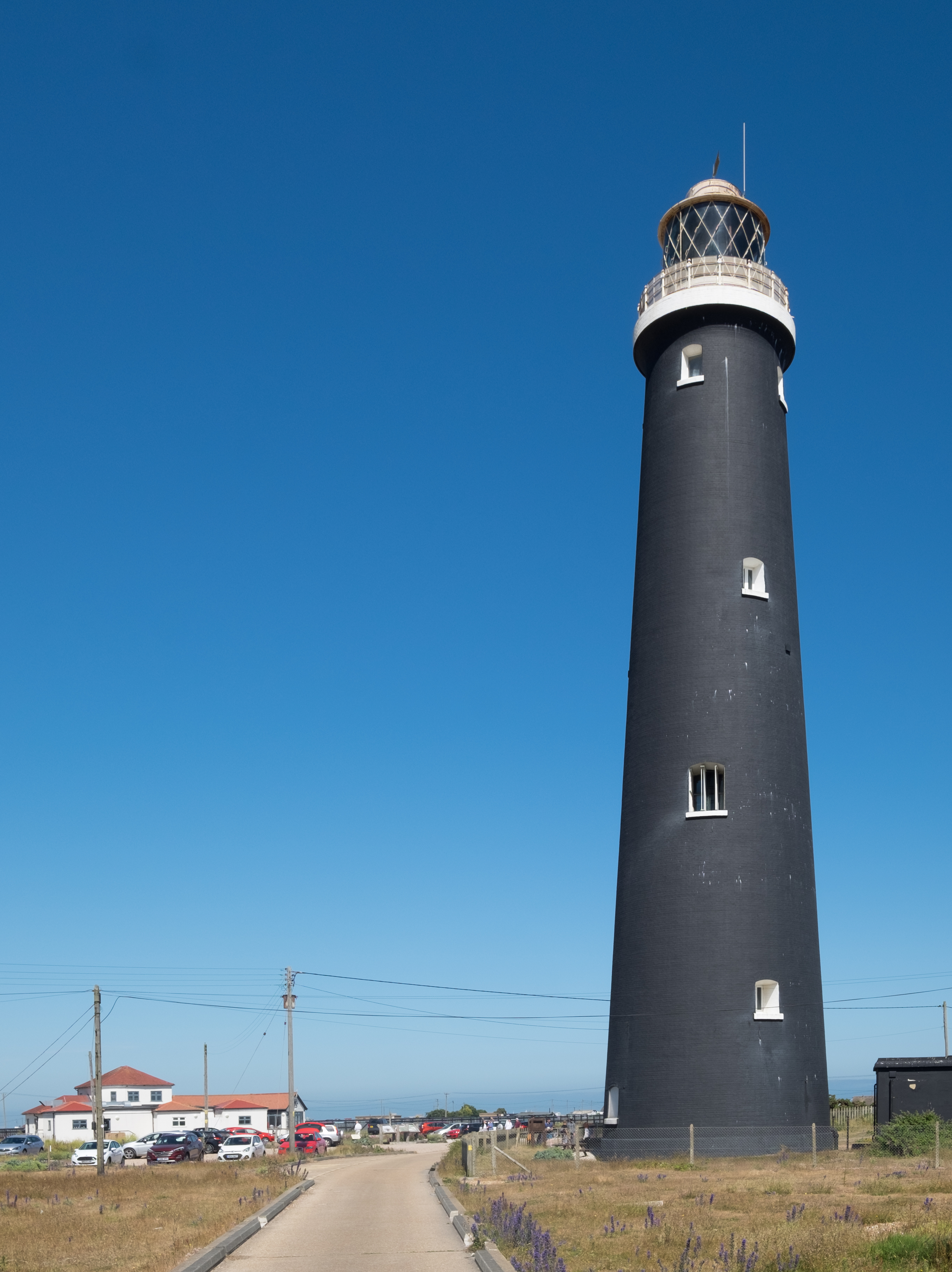
The 1904 lighthouse.

In 1901 building of the fourth lighthouse, known at the time as the High Light Tower, started. It had originally been intended to build it nearer the edge of the point, but there were problems with the foundations so it ended up being erected just 40 yards away from its predecessor. Opened by the Prince of Wales, it was first lit on 31 March 1904. The new tower was equipped with a revolving catadioptric optic which produced a flash every ten seconds. In addition it displayed red and green sector lights, from windows lower in the tower, indicating hazards and safe water both to the north-east and the south-west. Lit by incandescent mineral oil, it was claimed to be the second most powerful light on the English Channel (after Cap Gris-Nez); the main light had a range of 17.5 nmi (32.4 km; 20.1 mi), and the subsidiary light a range of up to 13 nmi (24 km; 15 mi). In 1920 it was the first Trinity House lighthouse to be equipped with a Paraffin Vapour Burner; PVBs would subsequently be installed in many of the corporation's lighthouses.

The tower still stands today; it is no longer in use as a lighthouse but is open as a visitor attraction. It is a circular brick structure, 41 m (135 ft) high and 11 m (36 ft) in diameter at ground level. It has 169 steps, and gives visitors a good view of the shingle beach. The main PVB lamp, the Fresnel lenses and the clockwork motor which turned the optic are all still in situ in the tower. It is a Grade II listed building.

==== Gallery ====
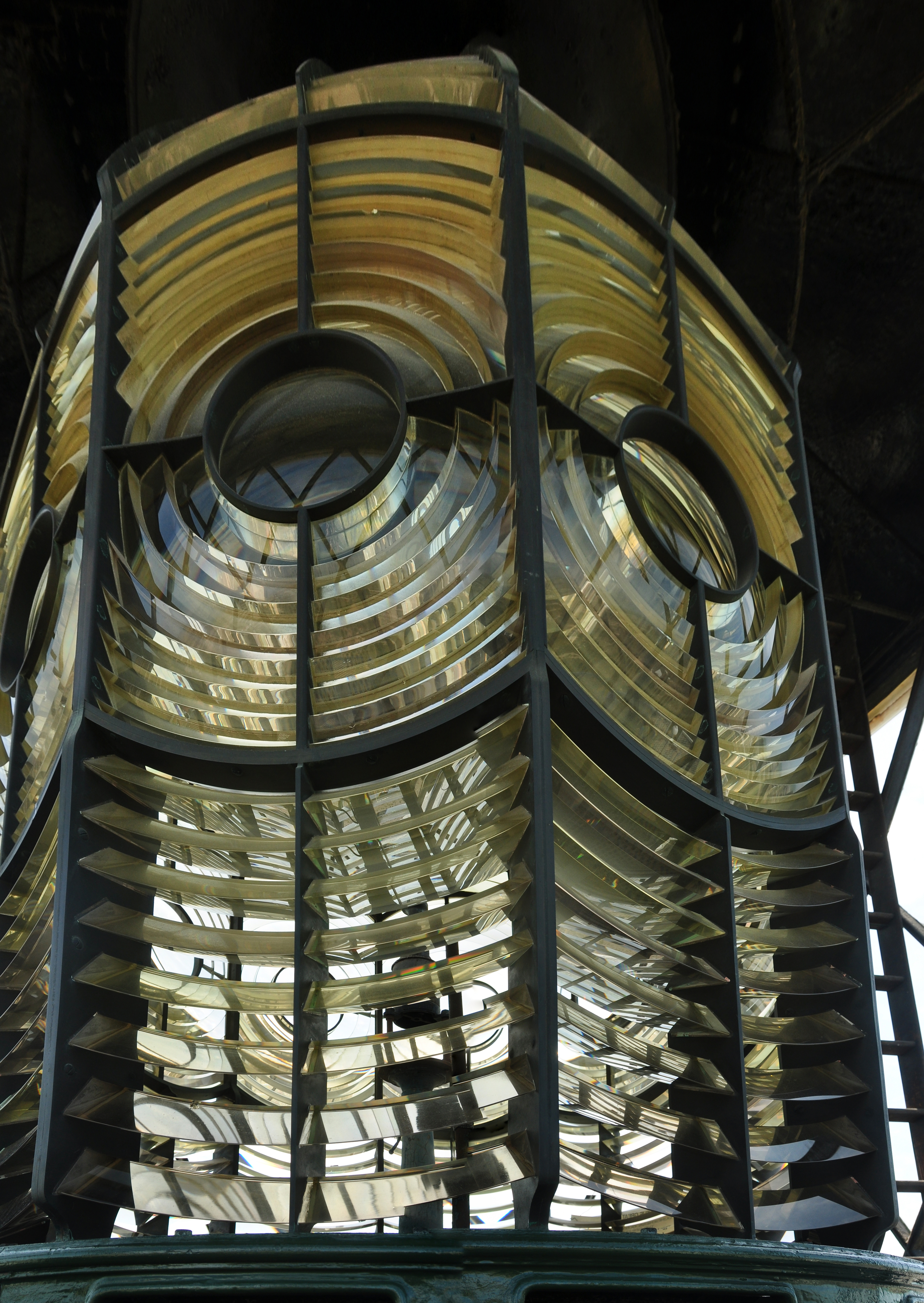
Main optic

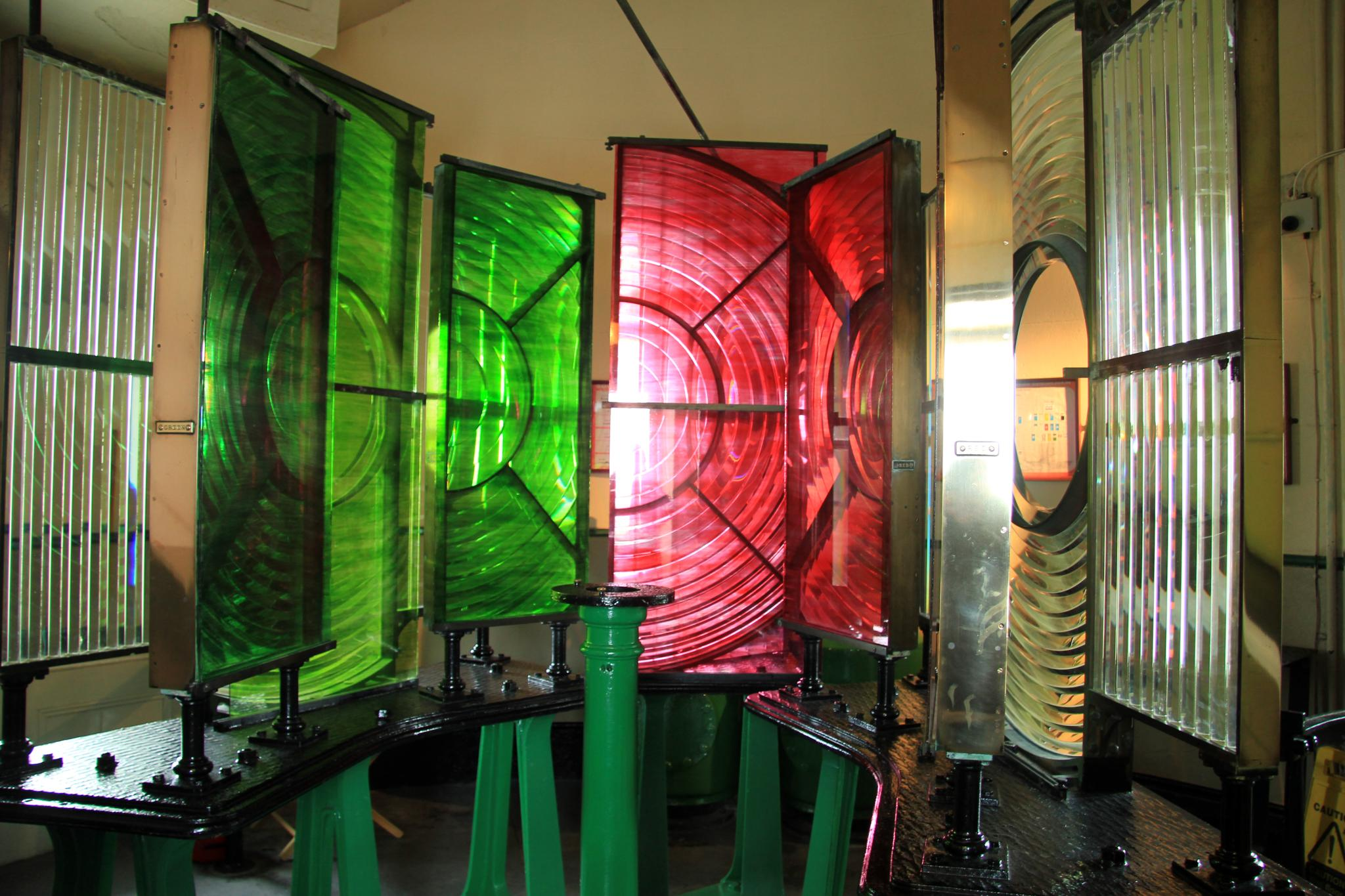
Sector-light optics

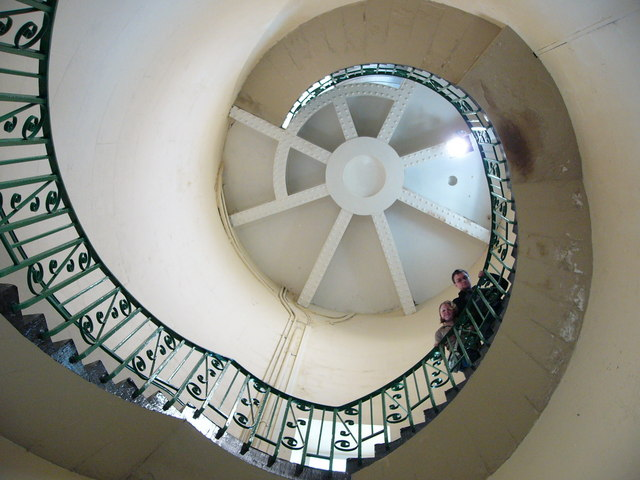
Internal staircase

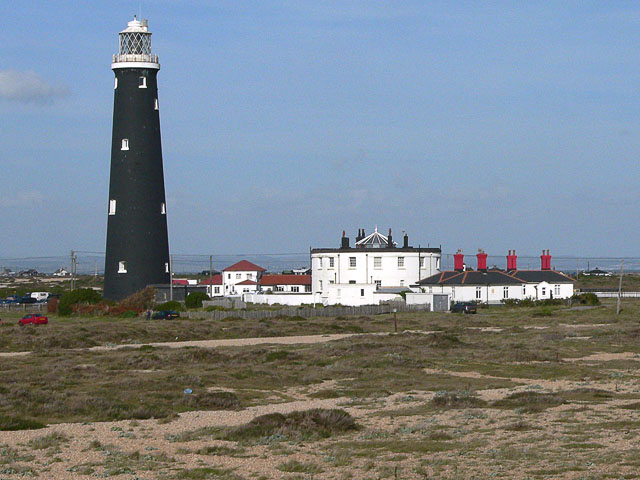
Former keepers' dwellings alongside

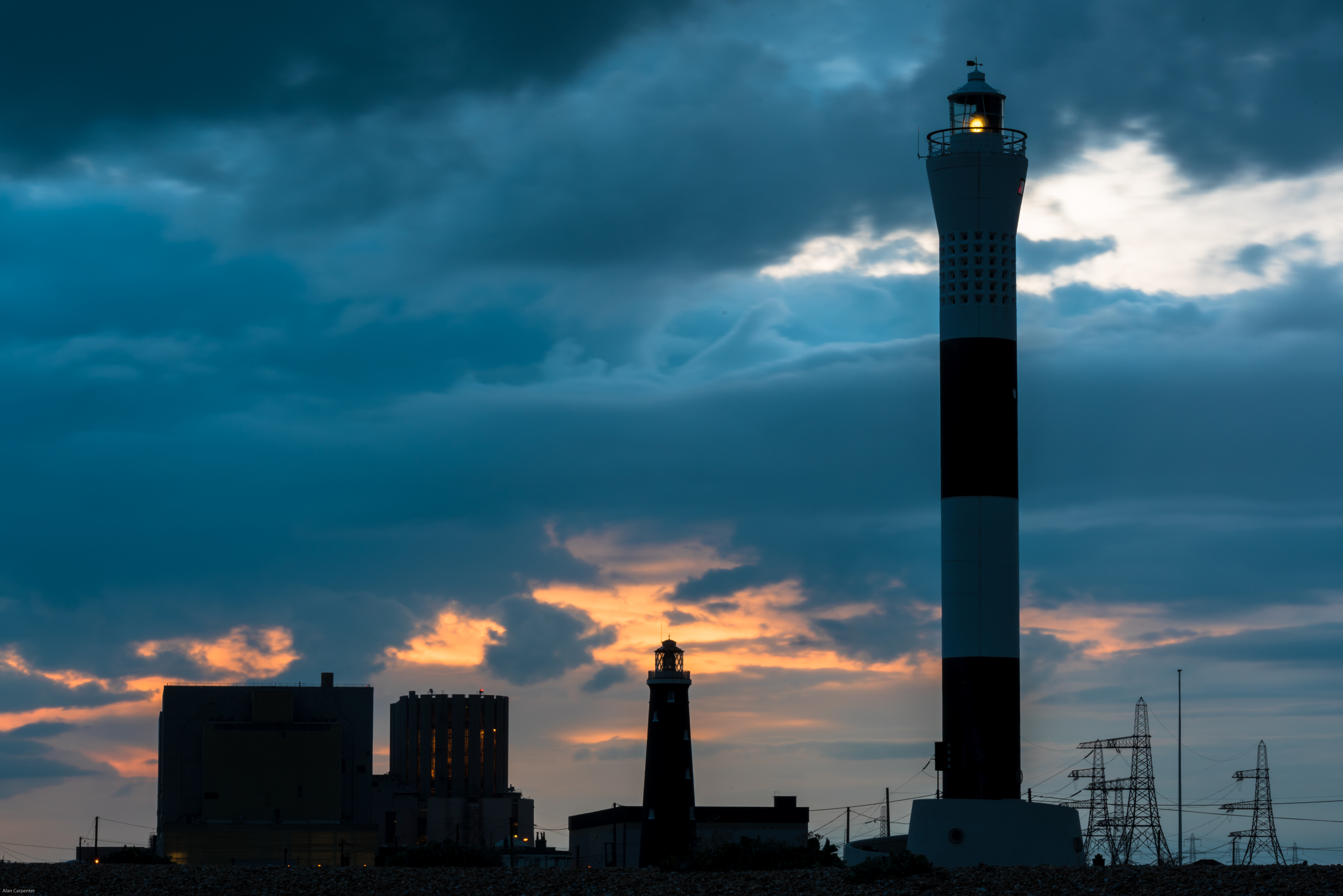
The 1961 lighthouse with the 1904 lighthouse and Dungeness A Nuclear Power Station beyond

=== Later fog signals and Low Lights ===
==== 2nd Low Light ====
In 1904, along with the rebuilding of the main lighthouse, a new Low Lighthouse was built together with a new fog signal house, 345 yards (315 m) to the east of its former location (and 485 yards (443 m) away from the new High Lighthouse). The new Low Light was a cylindrical metal tower, 40 ft (12 m) high with a focal height of 38 ft (12 m); it was painted red, as was the attached fog signal house. The latter had new siren equipment installed, including a roof-mounted pair of bell-mouth trumpets. Both light and fog signal retained the same characteristics as before. They entered service on the same day as the new High Light; the old fog signal house and light tower were then removed.

==== 3rd Low Light ====
In 1931-32 another new fog signal house was built with a new Low Lighthouse mounted on the roof; incorporated into the tower were a pair of new diaphone fog horns, placed at right-angles to each other. The Low light continued to retain its old characteristic of one flash every five seconds; it had a focal height of 45 ft (14 m) and a range of 11 nmi (20 km; 13 mi). The diaphone sounded three blasts every two minutes.

In July 1958, a further series of fog signal trials were undertaken at Dungeness, comparing a diaphone, siren and supertyfon air horn to a triple-frequency electric signal then under development; a version of the latter was subsequently incorporated into the design of the new Dungeness Lighthouse.

The Low Lighthouse and diaphone fog signal both remained in use until 1959, when they were removed to make way for the current lighthouse (which was built where they had formerly stood).

=== The fifth (current) Lighthouse ===
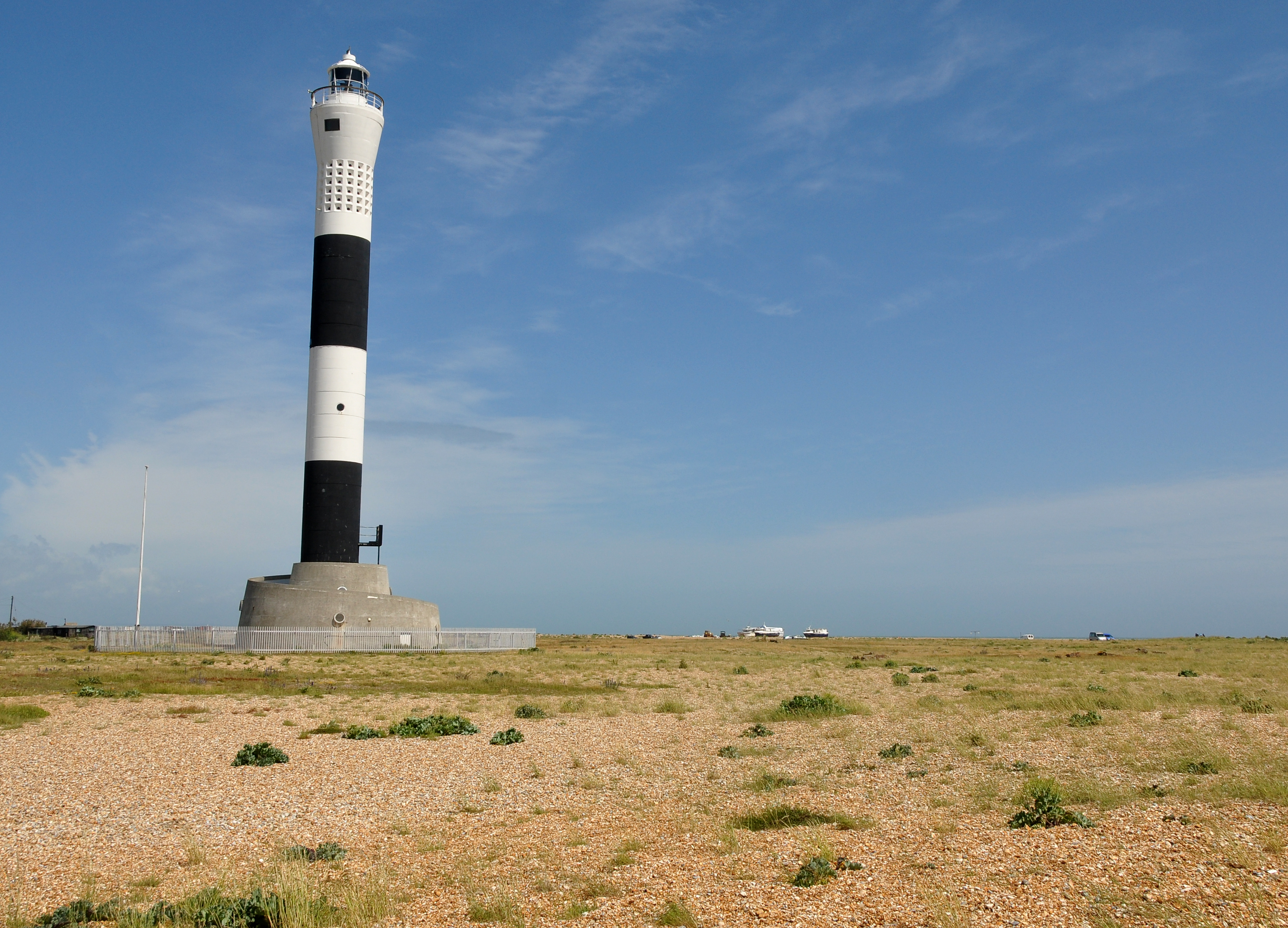
The current lighthouse

As the sea receded further, and after building the nuclear power station which obscured the light of the 1904 lighthouse, a fifth lighthouse, Dungeness Lighthouse was built and began operation in 1961. It was the first lighthouse to be equipped with a flashing xenon arc lamp as its light source (following an experimental period of use in the old lighthouse); however the new technology did not prove effective as an aid to navigation and it was replaced before long with an array of sealed beam units (these were themselves replaced in 2000 with a small rotating fourth-order optic, transferred from Lundy South Lighthouse). In addition to the main light, sector lights are displayed, from windows just below the lantern floor. The tower has been floodlit since 1962, to aid visual identification and to reduce the mortality rate of migrating birds, which had been prone to hitting the tower at night.

In 1954–56, trials had been carried out at Dungeness of a triple-frequency electric fog signal, sounded through tannoy emitters built into a curved stack of precast concrete blocks. The experiment was deemed a success, and tannoy stacks were subsequently installed by Trinity House at around a dozen lighthouse stations. At Dungeness itself, a stack of sixty such emitters was incorporated into the design of the lighthouse tower itself; these remained in use until the year 2000, when they were replaced by an electronic signal installed at the base of the tower. It sounded three blasts every minute (altered in 2022 to one blast every 30 seconds).

Since 2003 Dungeness Lighthouse has been a Grade II* listed building.

== See also ==
- List of lighthouses in England
- Grade II* listed buildings in Folkestone and Hythe
