= Frederick Hale Holmes =

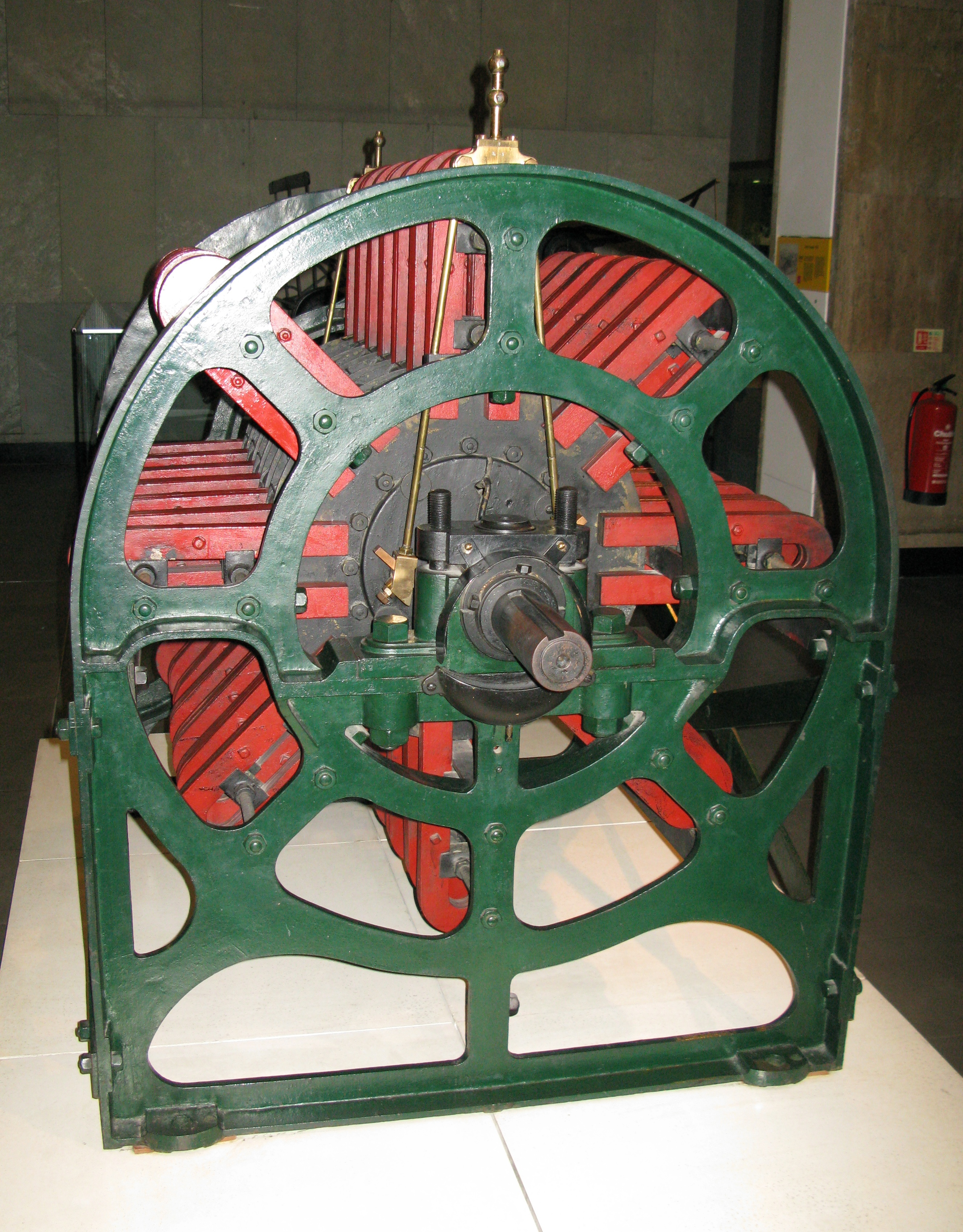
The generator from Souter Lighthouse at Science Museum in London, built by Frederick Hale Holmes.

Frederick Hale Holmes (1812 – 1875) was a professor of chemistry at the Royal Panopticon of Science and Art and pioneer of electric lighting.

== Career ==
In 1853 he demonstrated the ability of electro-magnetic generators to provide continuous current to power arc lighting and in 1856 patented a magneto to power an arc light for lighthouses which he demonstrated to Michael Faraday at Blackwall in 1857.

His experiments with alternating current arc lighting at South Foreland Lighthouse in 1857-60 were the subject of a lecture by Michael Faraday at the Royal Institution. One of Holmes' generators built in 1867 and used at Souter Lighthouse is displayed at the Science Museum, London.

He obtained "letters patent" for the invention of "improvements in machines known under the name of magneto-electric machines" and "provisional [patent] protection" for "improvements in apparatus for the production of electric light", and "improvements in fog signals, suitable for lighthouses and lightships."
