= John Yenn =

18th-century English architect

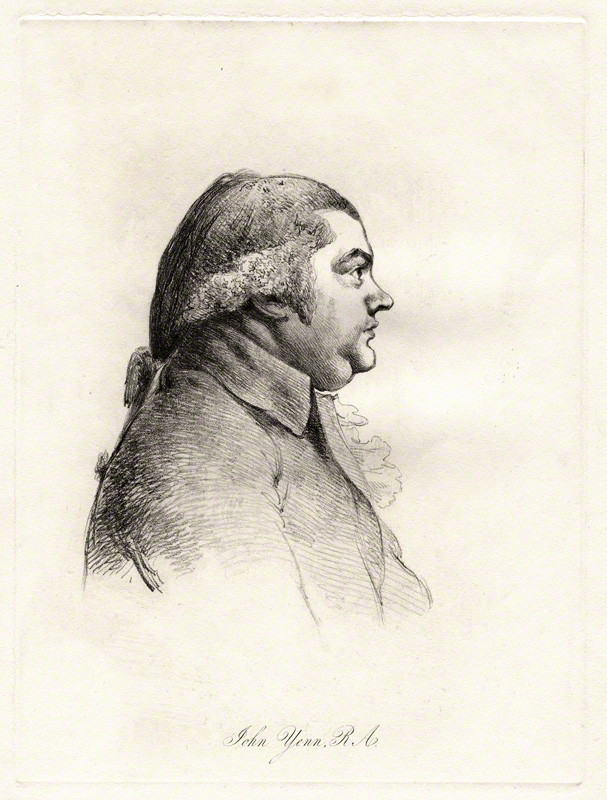
John Yenn by William Daniell, after George Dance, soft-ground etching, 17 November 1793

John Yenn RA (1750–1821) was an 18th-century English architect.

== Life ==
Yenn was born on 8 March 1750. He was a student at the Royal Academy from September 1769. He was elected an associate of the academy in 1774 and a full academician in 1791. He served as treasurer of the academy from 1796 to 1820.

He was a pupil of Sir William Chambers. In the late 1770s he succeeded Chambers as the Duke of Marlborough's architect at Blenheim Palace, where his works included, in 1789, the design of the small Corinthian "Temple of Health", built to celebrate the recovery of George III from illness. Nearby, in 1783, he built a new aisle at Woodstock church. Chambers provided him with a number of other important positions: in 1780 he became the Clerk of the Works at Richmond Park, and he later held the same position at Kensington Palace, Buckingham House and at the Royal Mews.
