= Eddystone Rocks =

Hazardous group of rocks southwest of Britain

- Reef
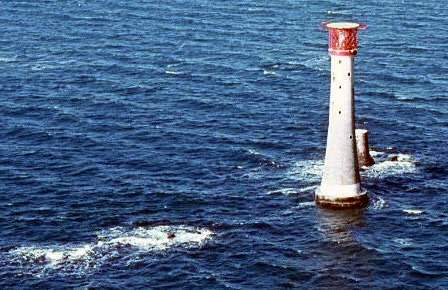
- The Eddystone Rocks, with current lighthouse and the remnants of previous tower

- Location within Devon
- Coordinates: 50°10.80′N 04°15.90′W
- Location: Devon, England

The Eddystone or Eddystone Rocks are a seaswept and eroded group of rocks ranging 9 miles (14 km) southwest of Rame Head in Cornwall, England, United Kingdom. Although the nearest point on the mainland to the Eddystone is in Cornwall, the rocks fall within the city limits of Plymouth, and hence within the county of Devon.

For centuries the rocks have been a hazard for the ships in the approaches to the English Channel and the port city of Plymouth. There have been four lighthouses on the Eddystone Rocks. Winstanley (two versions; the second replaced the top of the structure), Rudyard, Smeaton and finally the Douglass Lighthouse, which is the present one. When the Douglass Lighthouse was completed, the people of Plymouth paid for the dismantling of the Smeaton Lighthouse from the red rocks of Eddystone and its reassembly at Plymouth Hoe, where it is a popular tourist attraction today. The stub of the Smeaton lighthouse still remains on the rocks. In the 1970s, the question of geographical ownership (between England and France) was left undecided and was instead considered part of 'the provisional equidistance line for the continental shelf'.

The reef, inclusive of the area between the Devon coastline and Start Point, is home to many different fauna that have been the subject of scientific studies from 1895 to the present day. One particular study in 2012 investigated the relationships between the environment of the rocks and bottom deposits and marine inhabitants, with particular emphasis on rare specimens of gobies.

As regards geology, the Eddystone Rocks are composed of garnetiferous gneissic rock which is part of a considerable underwater outcrop of mica-schists and granitoid gneisses which are not found elsewhere in South West England. Research into the wave impact on these rocks has also been conducted, noting the weathering of the rocks and the lighthouses from these impacts. Research has also been conducted to test the metallic pollution of the sediments around the Eddystone Rocks, using mussels exposed underwater for 60 days in order to collect the data.

== History ==
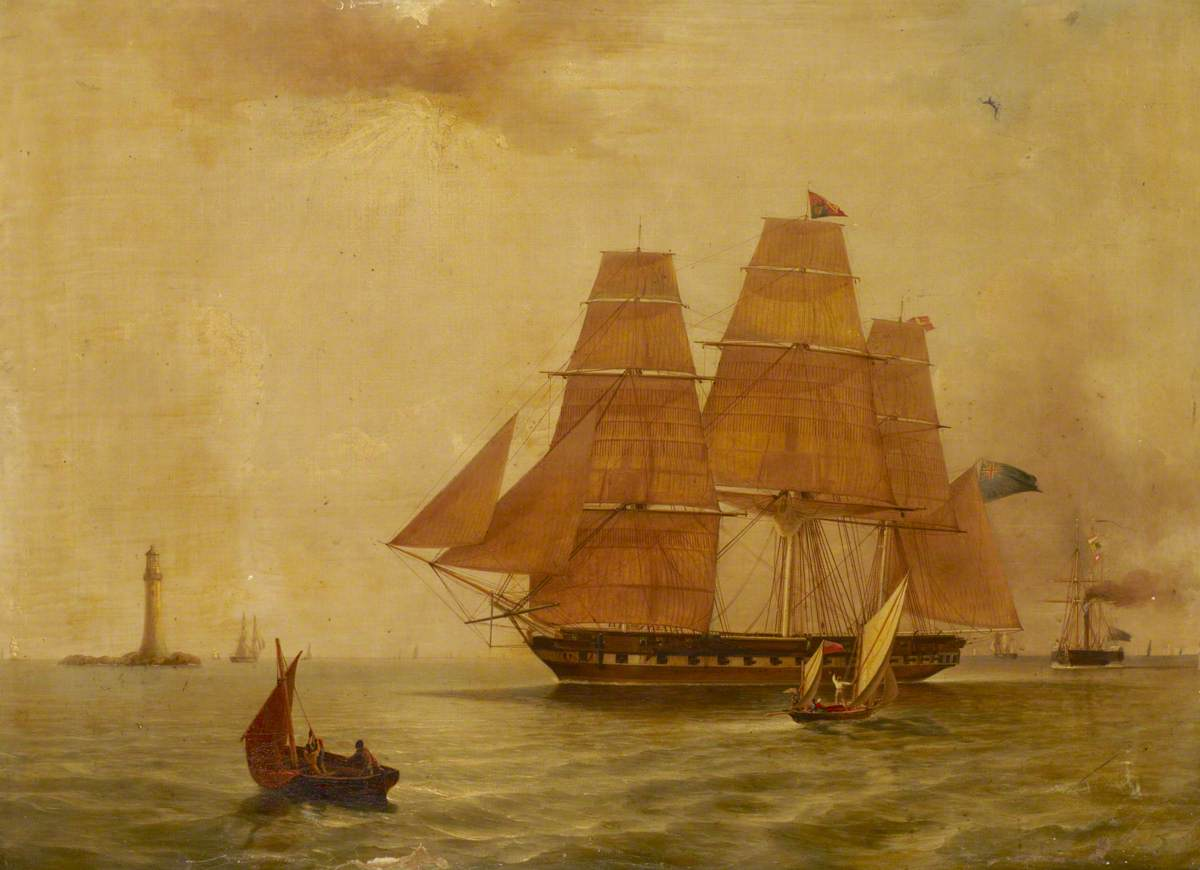
Painting depicting HMS Forte sailing past the Eddystone Lighthouse (background)

During the years 1877 to 1878, a correspondence between the Corporation of Trinity House to the Board of Trade was engaged in order to discuss the possible destruction of the reef as opposed to restoring the Eddystone Lighthouse. At the time, the tides had washed away the rocks below the lighthouse, raising concern for the stability of the structure itself. Due to the pressing economical and architectural issues, this correspondence discussed the proposal put forward by engineer T, P. Aston to blast the rocks away to allow ships to pass through into the English Channel, thereby rendering the presence of a lighthouse unnecessary.

Economically, consultant engineer Jas. N. Douglass estimated that the amount of rock to be cleared to achieve a safe minimum depth for navigation of ships was '1 3/4 millions of tons'. His concern in this estimate was the Eddystone reef rocks. According to Douglass, approximately an additional 'quarter-million tons' would need to be excavated from a neighboring area, Hand Deeps. The cost of the blasting and removal of these rocks was estimated to be 'no less than £500,000. However, a counterproposal to reinforce the rocks surrounding the lighthouse and to improve the structure of the architecture itself 'could not be executed for less than £120,000, and the time required to complete this work was complicated by the small window of opportunity the tides offered around the Eddystone reefs.

In the final letters of correspondence, Robin Allen of Trinity House confirmed that they as a corporation were not in a position to expend any 'public money [to] do away with such a sea-mark' as the Eddystone'. The rocks in question, known for being a maelstrom of churning waves and leaping spray, are unique in being the location of the first rock lighthouse in the world. Although the 'buffetings of wind and waves' have continually eroded the rocks around the structures on the Eddystone, constant repairs, and the construction over time of sturdier and more structurally sound lighthouses, has meant that the Eddystone remains intact.

In the mid 1970s, legal ownership of the Eddystone rocks and lighthouse was questioned in the Channel Arbitration between England and France. David Anderson, in a journal article on Marine and Coastal disputes, indicated that this question still remains, but a settlement was reached in deciding that 'since France had accepted Eddystone as a base point for fisheries purposes, the feature should be used as a base point in constructing the provisional equidistance line for the continental shelf.'

== Marine Life ==
In 1895, scientific investigations were conducted by E. J. Allen, B.Sc., Director of the Plymouth Laboratory, on behalf of the Marine Biological Association in order to ascertain information on the distribution of marine life within the Eddystone Reef. Using a geographical scope around the Eddystone Reef to as far as Start Point, a study was conducted on the relationship between the fauna found there and the influence of bottom-deposits as an environment for ecosystems. In the research study, there were a number of environmental factors that were considered against the marine inhabitants, such as 'the nature of the bottom deposit' and 'the movements of the water'.

In these areas, Allen's findings indicated a prevalence in fauna due to the environment created by the composition of the bottom deposit (sand, fine gravel, and root-fibers) as well as the untouched reef deep below the surface. The list of fauna included: Antennularia antennina, Aglaophenia myriophyllum, Cellaria and Polycarpa variants (Heller). However, he notes that the distribution of Aeyonium digitatum seems to 'indicate that the amount of movement of the bottom water is appreciably less on the grounds where the depth is greater than 33 fathoms than it is upon those from 28 to 33 fathoms'.

From 1992 to 2002, studies were conducted to identify the dominant ciliate protozoans and analyse the diversity around the Eddystone Rocks region. The samples collected from the water identified the tintinnids Helicostomella subulata, Stenosemella otiva, S. ventricosa, Tintinnopsis beroidea, T. cylindrica and T. lata. Additionally, and quite common in English coastal waters, oligotrich ciliates of the family Strombidiidae (order Oligotrichida) and choreotrich ciliates of the families Strobilidiidae and Strombidinopsidae (order Choreotrichida) were also found. A further nine oligotrich species were found: Laboea strobila, Strombidium acutum, S. dalum, S. wulffi and five unidentified Strombidium species, along with 'a new species of Strombilidium, two unidentified strobilids and a Strombidinopsis species closely resembling S. acuminatum'. E.D. Pilling, R.J.G. Leakey and P.H. Burkill also recorded that 'Haptorids of the family Mesodiniidae were also present including Rhabdoaskenasia sp. and the autotrophic species, Mesodinium rubrum'. Their study concluded that there were large bio-volumes of the protozoan group which, due to their transformation to phytoplankton carbon, suggested the ciliates become a source of food for 'pelagic predators' in the waters around the Eddystone Rocks. Some ciliates in the waters collected had mixotrophic qualities, though they are mostly 'considered to be heterotrophic'.

A study conducted in 2000, using benthic by-catch of beam trawl surveys, found that echinoderms are the dominant invertebrate species in the region around the Eddystone Rocks. J.R. Ellis and S.I. Rogers indicated a few important aspects of the environment for the distribution and diversity of marine life: the depth of the water and substrate of the Channel floor correlated to the amount of macroepibenthic echinoderms found. As the sampling was taken at deeper water levels, samples came from a more stable hydrodynamic environment due to the even temperatures and salinity of the water. Species found to be prevalent in this region include: Asterias rubens and Psammechinus miliaris, 'recorded at 85.5% and 56.0% of stations respectively', as well as Ophiothrix fragilis, recorded at '25.5% (by biomass)'.

In 2012, Lin Baldock and Paul Kay conducted research on the presence of rare Gobies in the waters between the Eddystone Reef and the coastline of Plymouth, Devon, namely Gobius gasteveni (Steven's goby).

== Geology ==
Isotopic ages suggest that the last period of deformation of the rocks exposed at the Eddystone Rocks was during the end of the Devonian period, but their highly metamorphosed state indicates they likely have an older ancestry, a relic of earlier tectonic activity, probably of Precambrian age. According to a study conducted by D. Robinson in 1981, the main mineral composition of the surrounding area is quartz-muscovite-chlorite, paragonite and albite. Just west of the Eddystone Rocks, others have found a higher grade paragonite than in other surrounding areas. The pressure systems differ in the northern (higher pressure system) and southern (lower pressure system) schist boundary. Robinson concluded that this difference impacts the facies series of metamorphic rocks, yet not enough to constitute a suture marking a Variscan subduction zone.

== Environment ==
Research has been done to test and record the current and wave impacts around the rocks and the lighthouses located there. After employing many video cameras and geophones in the area, the School of Marine Science and Engineering at Plymouth University discerned that although the rocks experience 'dramatic wave impacts', the Lighthouse itself remains in the 'safe limits for the worst wave measured during [Winter] storms'.

With 25% of sewage from the UK being deposited into coastal waters, studies were conducted to test the environmental impacts of metal-enriched sediments and sewage sludge on the marine life. In order to collect the data, Derek Johnson & Timothy J. Lack used mussels, which were left for 60 days at 15 test sites along the ocean bed. The mussels were then dissected, their digestive glands removed to then be 'mounted on a cryostat chuck by supercooling in hexane at - 70°C'. It seemed that the mussels closer to the ocean floor had a higher concentrations of metals than those closer to the surface. From this study, a connection between sewage pollution in the area and the metallic contamination of exposed marine flora and fauna was established.

== Legal framework and ownership ==
It has been mandated that the Eddystone Rocks constitute a 'basepoint for the delimitation of the continental shelf in the [English Channel]'. This means that under Article 13, the rocks themselves, since they can't sustain human habitation or economic life of its own, are not treated like other maritime areas in the legal constitutions of ownership.

== Media ==
The Eddystone Rocks are referenced and/or featured in the following books, pamphlets, songs and sea shanties:

- 'The Red Rocks Of Eddystone' by Fred Majdalany
- 'South Devon's Shipwreck Trail' by Jessica Berry
- "The Eddystone Light", a traditional sea-shanty, chronicles a fictional encounter between the lighthouse keeper and a mermaid. The Seekers, the Weavers, and Peter, Paul, and Mary have recorded the shanty.
