= Knott family =

British family of lighthouse keepers

The Knott family of lighthouse keepers is credited with the longest period of continuous service in the history of staffed lighthouses, commencing in 1730 at South Foreland, Kent, with William Knott and ending in 1906 at Skerries (Anglesey, Wales) with Henry Thomas Knott (son of George Knott – see below) who died in 1910 having retired to Crewe. There are three famous lighthouse-keeping families in England, the other two being the Darling (see: Grace Darling) and the Hall families. The three families are inter-related.

== South Foreland ==
Much of the contribution of the Knott family to lighthouse keeping was made at South Foreland Lighthouse where members oversaw many changes in lighting technology from coal fires to electricity. Two fixed white lights were exhibited as a 'high' and a 'low' light from the South Foreland from 1634. These were simple coal fires until 1793, during the time of William's service from 1730 and Henry's from 1777. In 1793, 53 cm (21-inch) diameter parabolic reflectors were used to concentrate and direct the light from burning sperm oil. In 1842/3 the towers of both lighthouses were partly rebuilt and the keepers and their families at both lighthouses benefitted from entirely new accommodation. Henry Thomas and his sons, George and John, were present in the late 1850s when Michael Faraday and Professor Holmes carried out the first experiments with electricity as a light source. Much work on the electrification of the lights continued from 1869.

== Henry Knott ==
During Henry Knott's period of service, in 1813, the great Scottish lighthouse engineer, Robert Stevenson paid a visit to the Forelands as part of one of his famous inspection tours. He wrote, "Find the South and North Foreland lights to be fitted up in the modern style with from 12 to 14 plated reflectors in each lightroom which were not thoroughly cleaned and some reflectors were in rather a dirty state. The lightkeepers are comfortably lodged and seem to be well pleased with their situations. The dwelling houses partake of that cleanliness which is general in the cottages of the English."

== George Knott ==
George Knott was the fourth in the succession. After serving under his father at the South Foreland low lighthouse, he was transferred in 1861 to the Smeaton tower on the Eddystone where he remained for five years as Principal Keeper. From there he moved to the little-known Bideford lighthouse where he remained until 1879 when he became Principal keeper of the newly opened Bull Point lighthouse. The final appointment of his career was at North Foreland, from where he retired. George was famous for his wonderful models of the lights in which he served. Models of Smeaton's tower, Bull Point and North Foreland still exist. The model of Bull Point is owned by Plymouth Museums. The North Foreland model is in a private collection. He made two models of Smeaton's Eddystone Lighthouse. The models were perfect in every detail, both inside and out. Fortunately, one has been preserved and is on display at the Chatham Historic Dockyard Museum. The other model was for many years on display at Trinity House where it was destroyed in 1941 during the Blitz.

== Henry Thomas Knott ==
Henry Thomas Knott (born 1851) worked through the replacement of colza oil by paraffin and the consequent replacement of old Argand burners with lamps having multiple wicks and then the even brighter incandescent oil burner which converted liquid oil into vapour before combustion. The life of a lighthouse keeper was a dangerous one. Whilst painting the roof of the Skerries lighthouse, Henry slipped on wet paint and almost somersaulted off the roof onto the rocks some 25 metres (80 feet) below. He managed to save himself when his clothing became hooked onto an iron stay. On another occasion, Henry bravely carried out the rescue of the crew of a small vessel, even though his small rowing boat was in constant danger of itself being smashed onto the rocks. Henry served out many appointments, one of which was a three-year overseas appointment in the extremely remote lighthouse on Minicoy Island in the Indian Ocean.

== Edmond Horton Knott ==
South Foreland lighthouse was also the site of experiments in radio communication by Marconi from 1898. This coincided with the service of the final member of the Knott lighthouse keepers, Edmond Horton who was keeper from 1899 to 1902. In March and April 1899, radio transmissions from South Foreland were of great assistance in the distress of at least two vessels on the Goodwin Sands.

== The Knott family history of lighthouse keeping ==
William Knott (born 1706 Acrise Kent. d. 1780) (Son of William Knott born 1680)

- South Foreland Low lighthouse (1730–1780, 50 years service). Duties assumed by his son.

Henry Knott (born 1748 St Margaret's at Cliffe. d. 1828) (Son of William (born 1706))

- South Foreland Low lighthouse (1777–1818, 41 years service). Handed over responsibility to his son.

Henry Thomas Knott (born 1797 St. Margaret's at Cliffe. d. 1870) (Son of Henry born 1748)

- South Foreland Low lighthouse (1818–1863, 45 years service) Assisted by his three sons, two of whom were transferred away.

Henry Knott (born 1818 St. Margaret's at Cliffe.) (Son of Henry Thomas born 1797)

- South Foreland Low lighthouse (1841)
- Flamborough Head lighthouse (1851–1880, 39 years service)

John Knott (born 1820 St. Margaret's at Cliffe. d. 1851 South Foreland High Light) (Son of Henry Thomas born 1797)

- South Foreland (1841–1851). Died in service, buried All Saints Church, St. Margaret's at Cliffe, Kent. (10 years service)

George Knott (born 1828 St. Margaret's at Cliffe d. 1904 Dover) (Son of Henry Thomas born 1797)

- South Foreland Low lighthouse (1847–1861)
- Eddystone (Smeaton tower) (1861–1866)
- Bideford lighthouse (1866–1879)
- Bull Point lighthouse (1879–1888)
- North Foreland lighthouse (1888–1891) (44 years service)

Henry Thomas Knott (born 1851 St. Margaret's at Cliffe. d. 1910 Crewe) (Son of George Knott born 1828)

- Entered the lighthouse service (December 1873)
- Skerries lighthouse (1874–1886)
- South Foreland lighthouse (1886–1887)
- Minicoy lighthouse (Maliku Atoll), Lakshadweep, India (1887–1890)
- St. Ann's Head lighthouse (1890–1894)
- South Stack lighthouse (1898–1899)
- Skerries lighthouse (1901–1905)
- Start Point lighthouse (1905–1908, 35 years service)

Edmond Horton Knott (born 1872 Braunton, Devon, d1943, Bedfordshire) (Son of George Knott born 1828)

- Entered the lighthouse service (April 1892)
- The Smalls lighthouse (1894)
- South Foreland lighthouse (1899–1902, 10 years service)

== Links to other lighthouse keeper families ==
The Knott family is linked to the Hall family of lighthouse keepers via the marriage (Holyhead 1877) of Henry Thomas Knott (born 1845) to Ellen Margaret Hall (born 1847 Dale, Pembs) daughter of John Hall (born 1810 Dale, Pembs) keeper of St. Ann's Low Light. The Knott family is also linked to the Darling Family of Lighthouse Keepers via the marriage of Thomas Owen Hall (born Dale, Pembs 1840) (Son of John Hall (born 1810 Dale, Pembs) keeper of St. Ann's Low Light) to Grace Horsley Darling (born Bamburgh 1844) (daughter of William Darling (born 1806 Bamburgh) Keeper of Farne Island Lighthouse) and niece of Grace Darling.
