= Henry Hall (lighthouse keeper) =

British lighthouse keeper killed by ingesting molten lead

- Born: 1661
- Died: 14 December 1755 (aged 94); East Stonehouse, Plymouth, England
- Cause of death: Internal burns from molten lead
- Occupation: Lighthouse keeper

Henry Hall (1661 – 8 December 1755), also referred to as Richard or Wm (i.e. William) Hall by contemporary sources, was a British lighthouse keeper who worked on the Eddystone Lighthouse, in the English county of Devon, some 9 statute miles (14 kilometres) southwest of Rame Head, Cornwall, UK.

== Background ==
Born in 1661, Henry Hall is the oldest-known member of the Hall Family of lighthouse keepers that kept lights around the English and Welsh coasts from at least the mid-eighteenth century until 1913. The Hall family intermarried with two lighthouse keeping families: the Knotts and the Darling family. One of the better known members of Darling family was Grace Darling, who participated in the rescue of survivors of the Forfarshire.

== Eddystone Lighthouse fire ==
Hall is remembered for his actions following a fire at the Eddystone Lighthouse on December 2, 1755, when the wooden Rudyerd's Tower of 1706 burned down. At around 9 p.m., approximately half an hour after Roger Short (also referred to as Thomas Short) had gone up to snuff the candles, Hall went up into the lantern and found it full of smoke, and upon opening the door to the outside of the lantern found the ceiling to be on fire. Unable to rouse his companions, Roger Short and Thomas Strout, he attempted to put the fire out by throwing buckets of water "four yards higher than his head". Hall was soon joined by the other two lighthouse keepers, who also tried to extinguish the fire. Hall looked up to check his progress and was showered with falling molten lead from the lighthouse roof. The lead fell upon his body burning his head, face, neck and shoulders. Hall later recalled having felt hot lead go down his throat. Hall continued to help his fellow lighthouse keepers but the three were unable to put the fire out. The men were forced to retreat down the tower and eventually made their way to a cave to avoid the falling red hot debris.

The lighthouse continued to burn into the morning and would continue to burn for the next five days. At around 10 a.m., the three men were spotted by a passing boat of fishermen. Due to rough surf, the sailors were unable to dock near the cave. The sailors threw a rope to Hall and his companions who tied them around their waists and were pulled through the water to the boat. They were taken to East Stonehouse, Plymouth where Hall was treated by Dr. Henry Spry (a surgeon at Plymouth) who tended to the man's burns and other injuries. Hall spoke to Dr. Spry "with a hoarse voice, scarce to be heard, that melted lead had run down his throat into his body" and was experiencing severe internal pain. Dr. Spry found Hall's claim unbelievable as he felt no person could survive having swallowed molten lead let alone live for hours afterward and be towed through water. Dr. Spry also noted that Hall was not exhibiting any other symptoms, was able to eat and drink without difficulty, and reasoned that the trauma of the accident and Hall's advanced age were causing him to make wild claims. Dr. Spry later noted in a report sent on 19 December 1755 to the Royal Society in London that Henry Hall was "aged 94 years, of good constitution, and extremely active for one of that age".

== Death ==
In the days following the fire, Hall was able to eat, drink and swallow medicine. He continued to tell Dr. Spry of the lead in his stomach and also told Josias Jessop when he visited him to collect his statement on the events. Hall seemed to be on the mend but by the sixth day, Dr. Spry observed that Hall's condition was declining. By this time, Hall could no longer eat or drink and began to rapidly worsen. Twelve days after the fire, aged 94, at his home in East Stonehouse, Plymouth, after "being seized with cold sweats and spasms of the tendons, he soon expired".

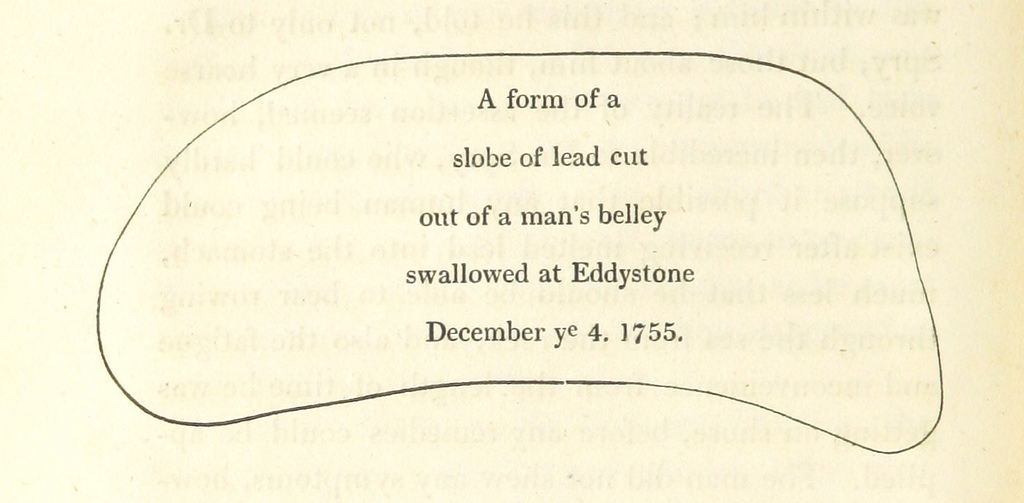
Outline of the slab of lead removed from Hall

Dr. Spry conducted an autopsy on Hall noting that, "left side of his body, below the short ribs, in the breast, mouth and throat ... left side of the head and face, with the eye extremely burnt". The autopsy revealed that "the diaphragmatic upper mouth of the stomach greatly inflamed and ulcerated, and the tunica in the lower part of the stomach burnt; and from the great cavity of it took out a great piece of lead ... which weighed exactly seven ounces, five drachms and eighteen grains." Depending on the system of units Spry was using, the lead weighed either 238.3 grams (apothecary system) or 208.5 grams (avoirdupois system). (Note: In the apothecary system, "7 ounces, 5 drachms, 18 grains" is equal to 3678 grains (238.330 grams). In the avoirdupois system: "7 ounces, 5 drachms, 18 grains" is equal to 3217 7/32 grains (208.472 grams). In both systems, 1 grain ≈ 0.0648 grams.)

Dr. Spry gave the following written account of how Hall and his two colleagues had explained to him how the lead came to be in Hall's stomach:

It will perhaps be thought difficult to explain the manner, by which the lead entered the stomach: But the account, which the deceased gave me and others, was, that as he was endeavouring to extinguish the flames, which were at a considerable height over his head, the lead of the lanthorn being melted dropped down, before he was aware of it, with great force into his mouth then lifted up and open, and in such a quantity, as to cover not only his face, but all his clothes.

Some doubts were brought upon the veracitiy of this claims when they were forwarded to the Royal Society on December 19, 1755, both due to the incredulity of the events as due to the fact Dr. Spry had been alone in the room when conducting the autopsy and the other two people present in the house at the time, Phillips, the daughter of Hall, and another woman, were only shown the piece of lead after it had been produced from the stomach. To disperse any doubt, Dr. Spry conducted a series of experiments with dogs and fowl to demonstrate that the heat of molten lead was not only not lethal when swallowed, but could be born by the stomach for several days without impeding feeding, and presented them to George Parker, 2nd Earl of Macchesfield and at the time president of the Royal Society. He also presented these results (including a live demonstration of the recovery of pieces of lead from the stomach of a live young chicken, sacrificed on site) to Dr. John Huxham, fellow of the Society, so he would support the veracity of his claims.

== Legacy ==
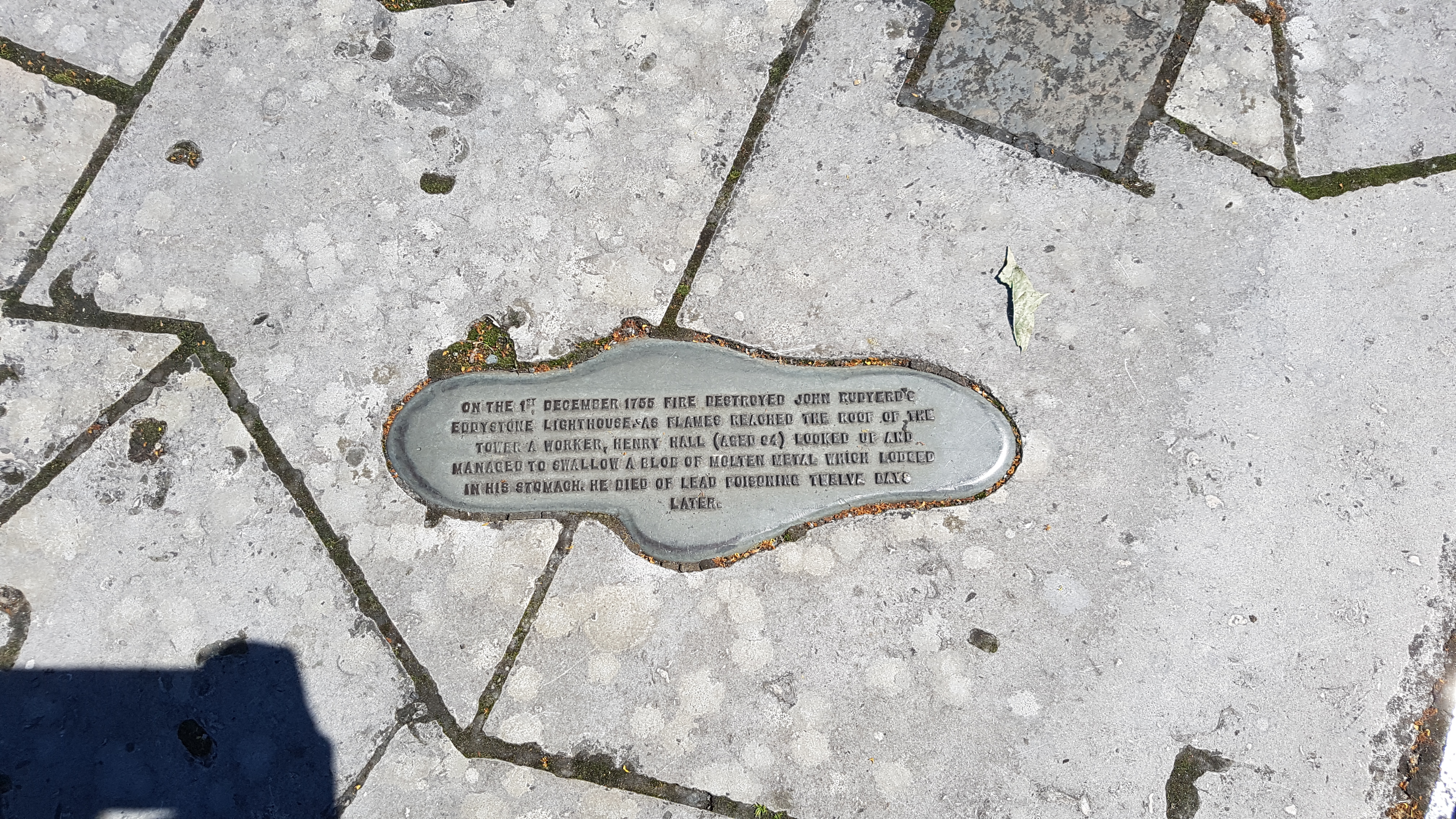
The plaque dedicated to Hall

There is a small plaque dedicated to Henry Hall with a few details as to the nature of this death located in Plymouth city centre, set into the pavement between Plymouth Pavilions, Salumi Bar & Eatery and The Duke of Cornwall Hotel, Millbay Road.

The piece of lead found in Henry Hall's stomach is now kept in the National Museum of Scotland.
