= Strombidium lagenula =

Scientific classification
- Domain: Eukaryota
- Supergroup: Alveolata
- Phylum: Ciliophora
- Class: Spirotrichea
- Order: Strombidiida
- Family: Strombidiidae
- Genus: Strombidium
- Species: S. lagenula

Binomial name
- Strombidium lagenula Fauré-Fremiet, 1924

Species of single-celled organism

Strombidium lagenula is a species of marine planktonic ciliates belonging to the genus Strombidium (which contains about 31 species) in the order Oligotrichida. Like other ciliates, they are unicellular eukaryotes (protists) that move using cilia. However in Strombidium lagenula and oligotrichs in general, the cilia on the cell body have been either lost or heavily reduced to "bristles", while the cilia surrounding the oral opening form large and prominent structures called membranelles, which are also used for locomotion.

Strombidium lagenula was described in 1924 by Fauré-Fremiet. They are spherical or bell-shaped, about 60 μm long, and are distinguished from other species of Strombidium by a raised girdle of trichocysts near the posterior end of the cell.
