= Eddystone Lighthouse =

Lighthouse in Cornwall, England

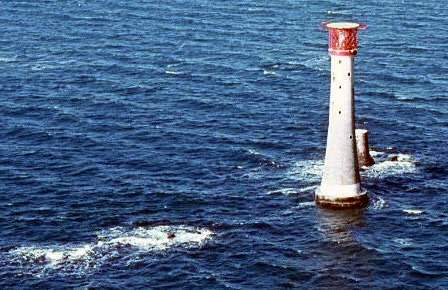
- An aerial view of the fourth lighthouse. (The stub of the third lighthouse is visible in the background.)
- Location: Offshore Rame Head, England, United Kingdom
- Coordinates: 50°10′48″N 04°15′54″W

Tower
- Constructed: 1698 (first); 1709 (second); 1759 (third); 1878–1881 (fourth)
- Construction: Wooden tower (first and second); Granite tower (third and current)
- Automated: 1982
- Height: 18 metres (59 ft) (first); 21 metres (69 ft) (second); 22 metres (72 ft) (third); 49 metres (161 ft) (current)
- Shape: Octagonal tower (first); Dodecagonal tower (second); Tapered cylindrical tower (third); Tapered cylindrical tower with lantern and helipad on the top (current)
- Power source: solar power
- Operator: Trinity House
- Heritage: Historic Civil Engineering Landmark
- Fog signal: One blast every 30s.
- Racon: T

Light
- First lit: 1882 (current)
- Deactivated: 1703 (first); 1755 (second); 1877 (third)
- Focal height: 41 metres (135 ft)
- Lens: 4th order 250 mm (10 in) rotating
- Intensity: 26,200 candela
- Range: 17 nautical miles (31 km)
- Characteristic: Fl (2) W 10s. Iso R 10s. at 28 metres (92 ft) focal height

The Eddystone Lighthouse is a lighthouse on the Eddystone Rocks, 9 statute miles (14 km) south of Rame Head in Cornwall, England. The rocks are submerged, and are composed of Precambrian gneiss.

The current structure is the fourth to be built on the site. The first lighthouse (Winstanley's) was swept away in a powerful storm, killing its architect and five other men in the process. The second (Rudyard's) stood for fifty years before it burned down. The third (Smeaton's) is renowned because of its influence on lighthouse design and its importance in the development of concrete for building; its upper portions were re-erected in Plymouth as a monument. The first lighthouse, completed in 1699, was the world's first open ocean lighthouse, although the Cordouan Lighthouse off the western French coast preceded it as the first offshore lighthouse.

== The need for a light ==
The Eddystone Rocks are an extensive reef approximately 12 miles (19 km) SSW off Plymouth Sound, one of the most important naval harbours of England, and midway between Lizard Point, Cornwall and Start Point. They are submerged at high spring tides and were so feared by mariners entering the English Channel that they often hugged the coast of France to avoid the danger, which thus resulted not only in shipwrecks locally, but on the rocks of the north coast of France and the Channel Islands. Given the difficulty of gaining a foothold on the rocks particularly in the predominant swell it was a long time before anyone attempted to place any warning on them.

== Winstanley's lighthouse ==
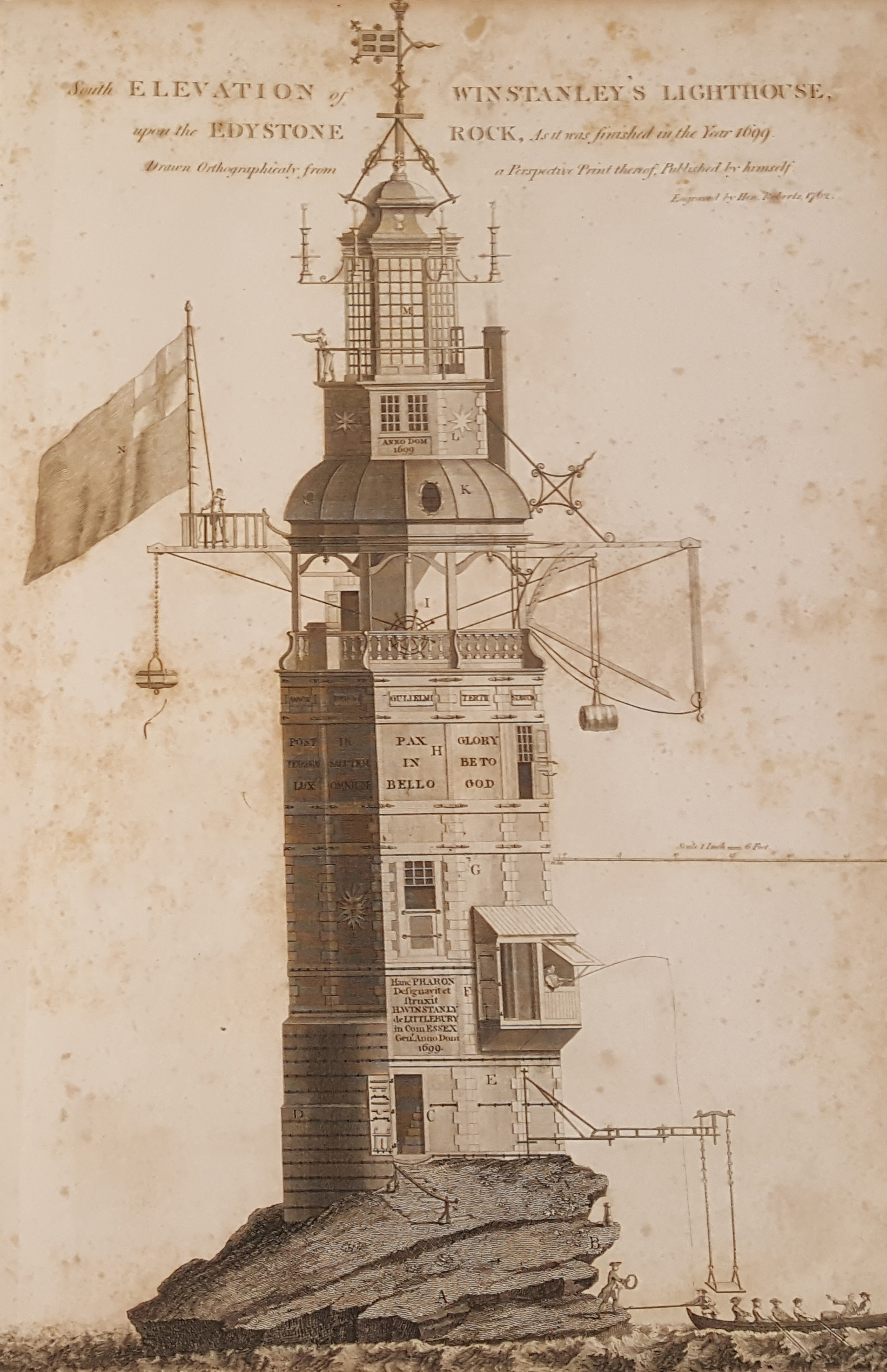
Original Winstanley lighthouse, Eddystone Rock, by Jaaziell Johnston, 1813

The first lighthouse on Eddystone Rocks was an octagonal wooden structure built by Henry Winstanley. The lighthouse was also the first recorded instance of an open-sea lighthouse. Construction started in 1696 and the light was lit on 14 November 1698. During construction, a French privateer took Winstanley prisoner and destroyed the work done so far on the foundations, causing Louis XIV to order Winstanley's release with the words "France is at war with England, not with humanity".

The lighthouse survived its first winter but was in need of repair, and was subsequently changed to a dodecagonal (12 sided) stone clad exterior on a timber-framed construction with an octagonal top section as can be seen in the later drawings or paintings. The octagonal top section (or 'lantern') was 15 ft (4.6 m) high and 11 ft (3.4 m) in diameter, its eight windows each made up of 36 individual glass panes. It was lit by '60 candles at a time, besides a great hanging lamp'.

Winstanley's tower lasted until the great storm of 1703 erased almost all trace on 8 December [O.S. 27 November]. Winstanley was on the lighthouse, completing additions to the structure. No trace was found of him, or of the other five men in the lighthouse.

The cost of construction and five years' maintenance totalled £7,814 7s.6d, during which time dues totalling £4,721 19s.3d had been collected at one penny per ton from passing vessels.

== Rudyard's lighthouse ==
A contemporary painting of Rudyard's lighthouse by Isaac Sailmaker.

Eddystone Lighthouse Act 1705
- Act of Parliament
- Parliament of Great Britain
- Long title: An Act for the better enabling the Master, Wardens, and Assistants, of Trinity House, to rebuild the Light-house on The Edystone Rock.
- Citation: 4 & 5 Ann. c. 7 (Note: This is the citation in The Statutes of the Realm.); 4 Ann. c. 20 (Note: This is the citation in The Statutes at Large.)
- Territorial extent: England and Wales

Dates
- Royal assent: 19 March 1706
- Commencement: 25 October 1705 (Note: Start of session.)
- Repealed: 15 July 1867
Other legislation
| Amended by | Eddystone Lighthouse Act 1709 |
| Repealed by | Statute Law Revision Act 1867 |

Status: Repealed

Text of statute as originally enacted

Eddystone Lighthouse Act 1709
- Act of Parliament
- Parliament of Great Britain
- Long title: An Act for explaining and making more effectual an Act, for the better enabling the Master, Wardens, and Assistants of Trinity House, to re-build the Light-house on the Edistone Rock.
- Citation: 8 Ann. c. 17
- Territorial extent: Great Britain

Dates
- Royal assent: 5 April 1710
- Commencement: 15 November 1709
- Repealed: 15 July 1867
Other legislation
| Amends | Eddystone Lighthouse Act 1705 |
| Repealed by | Statute Law Revision Act 1867 |

Status: Repealed

Text of statute as originally enacted

Following the destruction of the first lighthouse, Captain John Lovett (Note: WBName) acquired the lease of the rock, and by an act of Parliament, the Eddystone Lighthouse Act 1705 (4 & 5 Ann. c. 7), was allowed to charge passing ships a toll of one penny per ton. He commissioned John Rudyard (or Rudyerd) to design the new lighthouse.

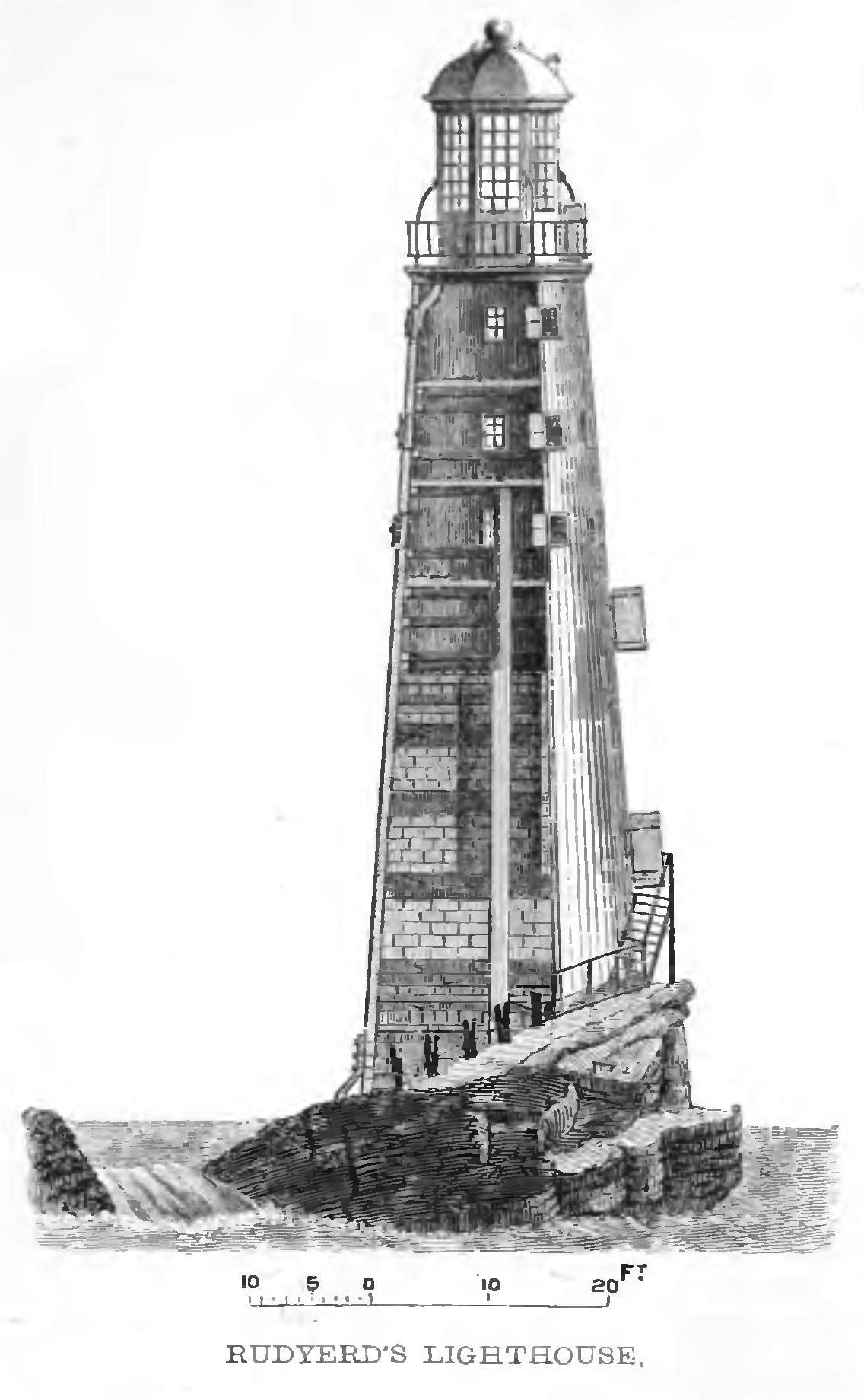
Cross section of Rudyard's lighthouse.

Rudyard's lighthouse, in contrast to its predecessor, was a smooth conical tower, shaped 'so as to offer the least possible resistance to wind and wave'. It was built on a base of solid wood, formed from layers of timber beams, laid horizontally on seven flat steps which had been cut into the upper face of the sloping rock. On top of this base rose several courses of stone, interspersed with further layers of wood, which was designed to serve as ballast for the tower. This substructure rose to a height of 63 feet (19 m), on top of which were raised four storeys of timber. The entire structure was sheathed in vertical wooden planks and anchored to the reef using 36 wrought iron bolts, forged to fit deep dovetailed holes which had been cut in the reef. The vertical planks were installed by two master-shipwrights from Woolwich Dockyard and were caulked like those of a ship. The tower was topped with an octagonal lantern, which brought it to a total height of 92 feet (28 m). A light was first shone from the tower on 8 August [O.S. 28 July] 1708 and the work was completed in 1709. The light was provided by 24 candles. Rudyard's lighthouse proved more durable than its predecessor, surviving and serving its purpose on the reef for nearly 50 years.

In 1715 Captain Lovett died and his lease was purchased by Robert Weston, Esq., in company with two others (one of whom was Rudyard).

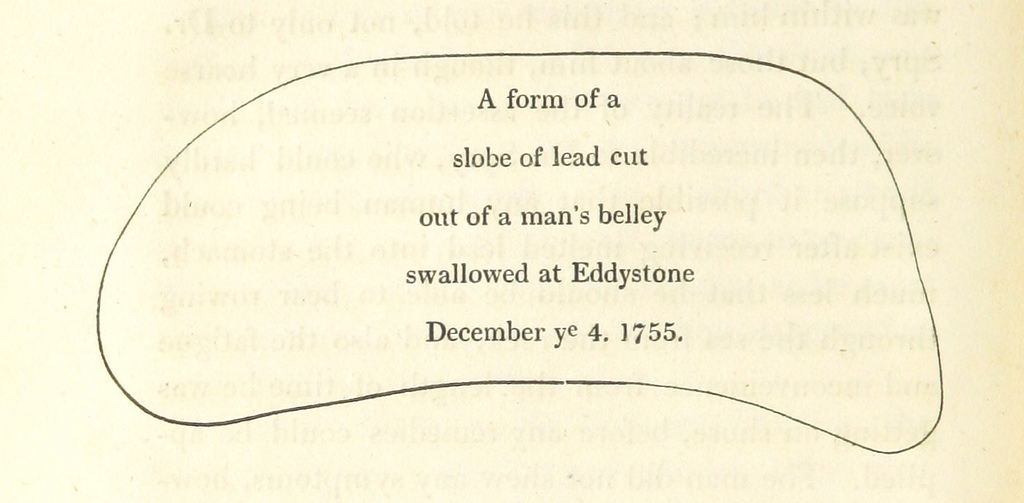
Outline of slab of lead removed from the stomach of Henry Hall, who swallowed the molten lead as it fell from the lantern roof during the 1755 fire

On the night of 2 December 1755, the top of the lantern caught fire, probably through a spark from one of the candles used to illuminate the light, or else through a fracture in the chimney which passed through the lantern from the stove in the kitchen below. The three keepers threw water upwards from a bucket but were driven onto the rock and were rescued by boat as the tower burnt down. Keeper Henry Hall, who was 94 at the time, died several days later from ingesting molten lead from the lantern roof. A report on this case was submitted to the Royal Society by physician Edward Spry, and the piece of lead is now in the collections of the National Museums of Scotland.

== Smeaton's lighthouse ==
The third lighthouse to be built on the Eddystone marked a major step forward in the design of such structures.

=== Design and building ===
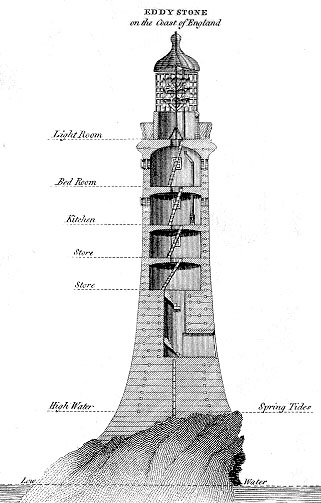
Smeaton's Lighthouse

Following the destruction of Rudyard's tower, Robert Weston sought advice on rebuilding the lighthouse from the Earl of Macclesfield, then President of the Royal Society. He recommended mathematical instrument maker and aspiring civil engineer, John Smeaton, who was introduced to Weston in February 1756. In May, following a series of visits to the rock, Smeaton proposed that the new lighthouse should be built of stone and modelled on the shape of an oak tree. He appointed Josias Jessop to serve as his general assistant, and established a shore base for the construction works at Millbay.

Work began on the reef in August 1756, with the gradual cutting away of recesses in the rock which were designed to dovetail in due course with the foundations of the tower. During the winter, the workers stayed ashore and were employed in dressing the stone for the lighthouse; work then resumed on the rock the following June, with the laying of the first courses of stone. The foundations and outside structure were built of local Cornish granite, while lighter Portland limestone masonry was used on the inside. As part of the construction process, Smeaton pioneered 'hydraulic lime', a concrete that cured under water, and developed a technique of securing the blocks using dovetail joints and marble dowels. Work continued over the course of the following two years, and the light was first lit on 16 October 1759.

Smeaton's lighthouse was 59 feet (18 m) high and had a diameter at the base of 26 feet (7.9 m) and at the top of 17 feet (5.2 m). It was lit by a chandelier of 24 large tallow candles.

=== Later modifications ===
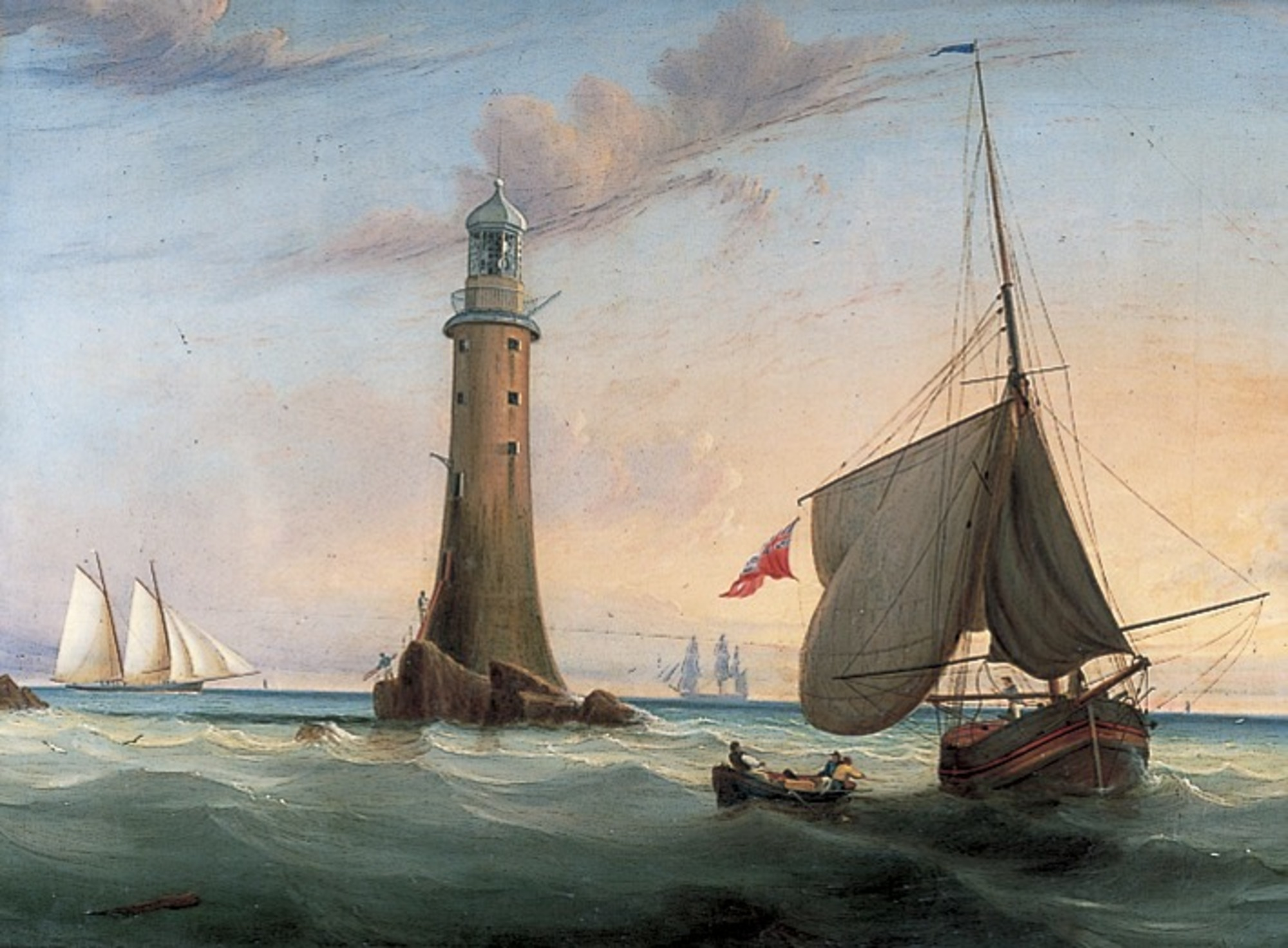
Early 19th-century painting of the lighthouse by John Lynn, showing the reflectors in place in the lantern.

In 1807 the 100-year lease on the lighthouse expired, whereupon ownership and management devolved to Trinity House. In 1810 they replaced the chandelier and candles with 24 Argand lamps and parabolic reflectors.

In 1841 major renovations were made, under the direction of engineer Henry Norris of Messrs. Walker & Burges, including complete repointing, replacement water tanks and filling of a large cavity in the rock close to the foundations. In 1845 the lighthouse was equipped with a new second-order fixed catadioptric optic, manufactured by Henry Lepaute of Paris, with a single multi-wick oil lamp, replacing the old lamps and reflectors. This was the first time that a fully catadioptric large optic (using prisms rather than mirrors above and below the lens) had been constructed, and the first such installation in any lighthouse. A new lantern was constructed and fitted to the top of the tower in 1848, as the original had proved unsatisfactory for housing the new optic.

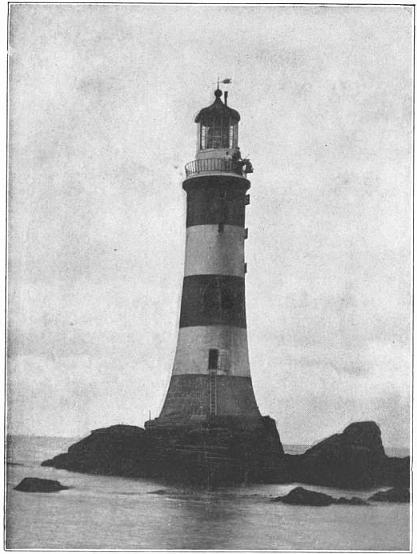
A photograph of the lighthouse in the 1870s, showing new lantern with 'beehive' lens optic and fog bell.

From 1858 the tower's exterior was painted with broad red and white horizontal bands, so as to render it 'more distinctly visible during the day time'. In 1872 a 5 cwt (254 kg) fog bell was provided for the lighthouse; it was sounded 'five times in quick succession every half minute' in foggy weather. That same year an improved lamp was installed, which more than doubled the intensity of the light.

In 1877 it was resolved to build a replacement lighthouse, following reports that erosion to the rocks under Smeaton's tower was causing it to shake from side to side whenever large waves hit. During construction of the new lighthouse, the Town Council of Plymouth petitioned for Smeaton's tower to be dismantled and rebuilt on Plymouth Hoe, in lieu of a Trinity House daymark which stood there. Trinity House consented to the removal and delivery of the lantern and the upper four rooms of the tower, the cost of labour to be borne by Plymouth Council. While the new tower was being built the old lighthouse remained operational, up until 3 February 1882 (after which a temporary fixed light was shown from the top of the new tower). When the latter was complete, Smeaton's lighthouse was decommissioned and the crane which had been used to build the new lighthouse was transferred to the task of dismantling the old. William Tregarthen Douglass supervised the operation.

=== Present day ===
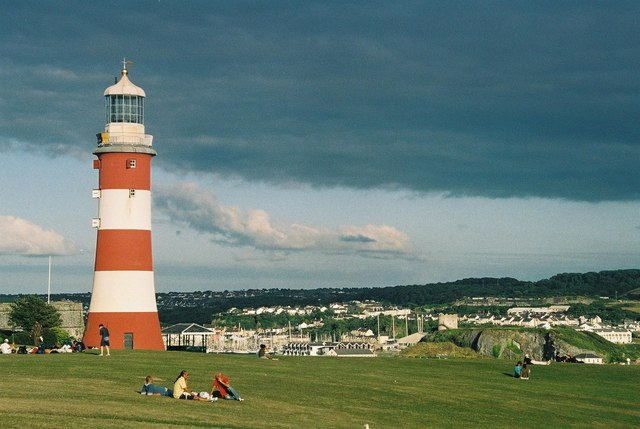
Smeaton's Tower on its replica base, on Plymouth Hoe.

The upper part of Smeaton's lighthouse was subsequently rebuilt, as planned, on top of a replica granite frustum on Plymouth Hoe: preserved 'as a monument to Smeaton's genius, and in commemoration of one of the most successful, useful and instructive works ever accomplished in civil engineering'. The rebuilding was funded by public subscription. It remains in place today and, as 'Smeaton's Tower', is open to the public as a tourist attraction.

The original frustum or base of the tower also survives, standing where it was built on the Eddystone rocks, 120 feet (37 m) from the current lighthouse. Having dismantled the upper part of the structure, Douglass infilled the old entrance way and stairwell within the frustum and fixed an iron mast to the top of the stub tower. He expressed the hope that 'the rock below will for ages endure to support this portion of Smeaton's lighthouse, which, in its thus diminished form, is still rendering important service to the mariner, in giving a distinctive character to the Eddystone by day'.

== Douglass's lighthouse ==
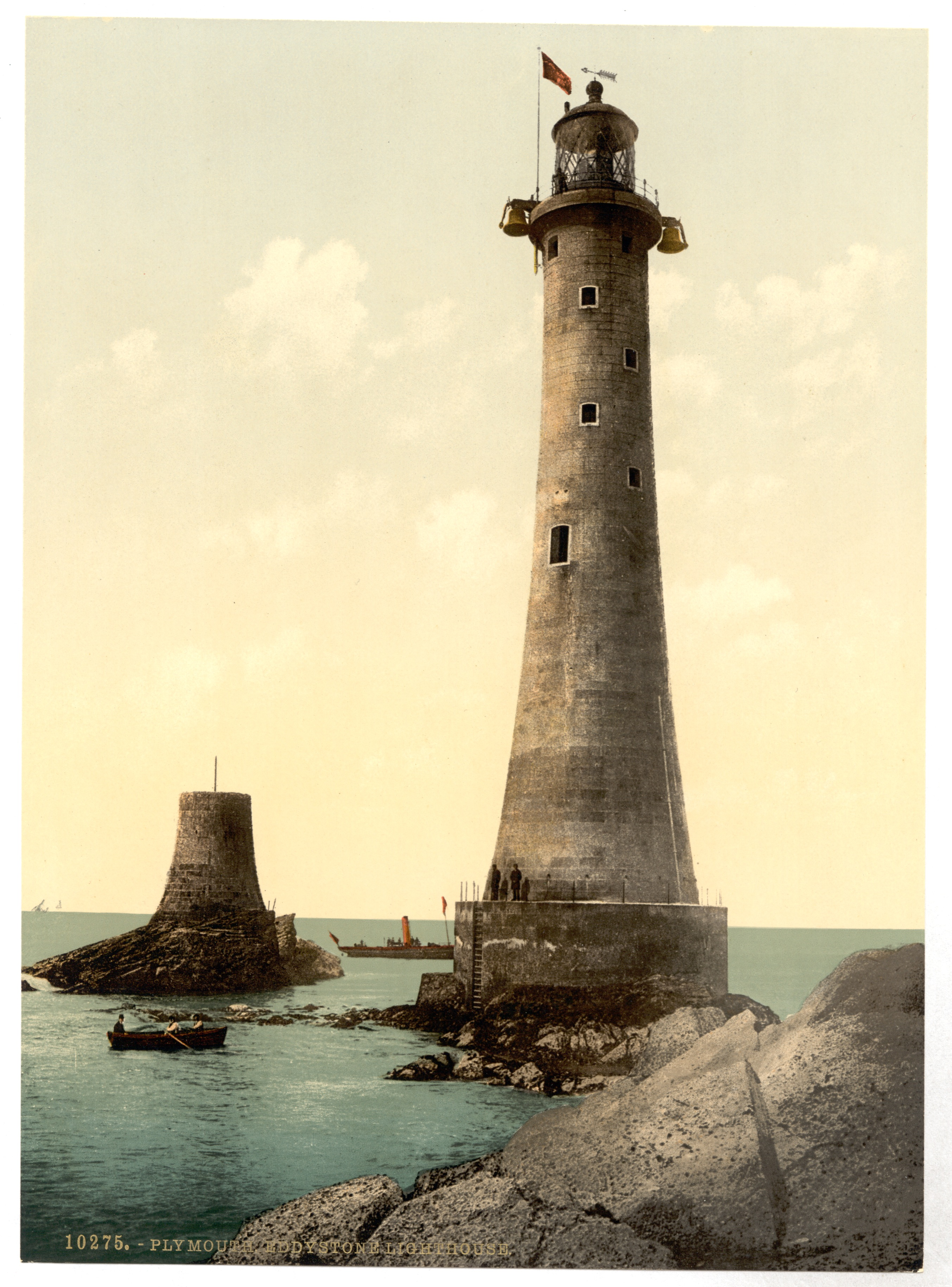
Late 19th-century colourised photograph of Douglass's lighthouse (with the remaining lower part of the old lighthouse alongside).

The current, fourth lighthouse was designed by James Douglass (using Robert Stevenson's developments of Smeaton's techniques). This lighthouse is still in use.

=== Design and building ===
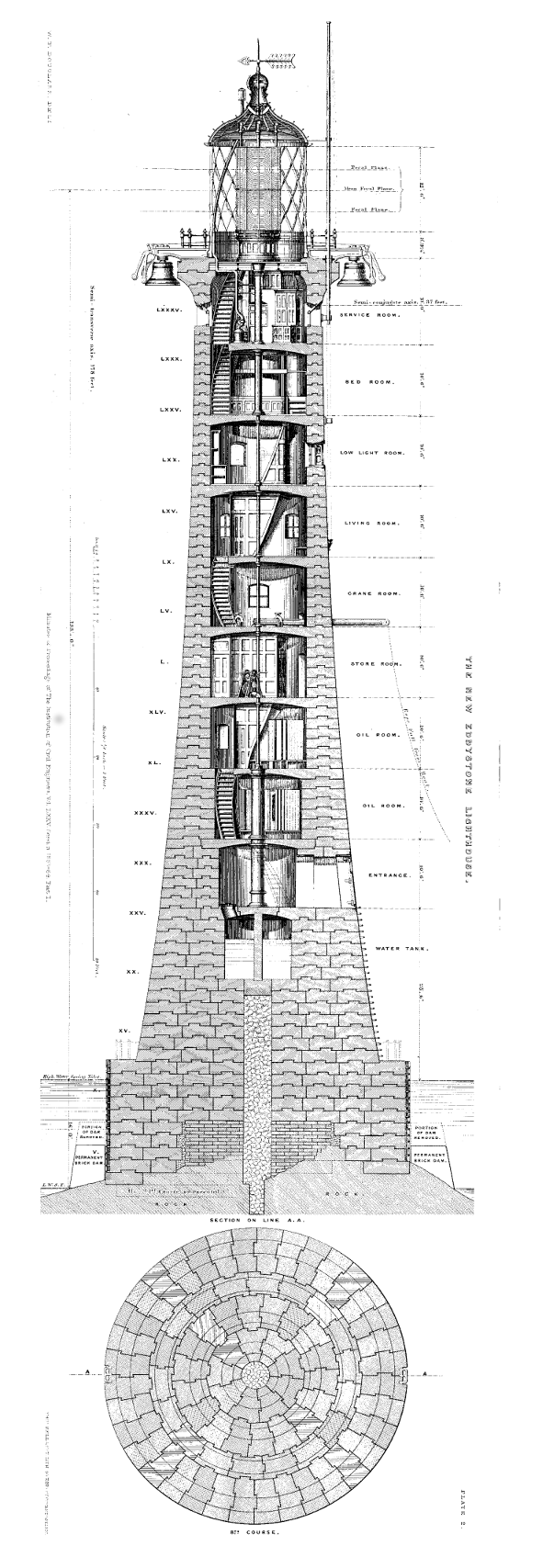
Original drawing of 4th Eddystone Lighthouse.

By July 1878 the new site, on the South Rock was being prepared during the 3½ hours between ebb and flood tide; the foundation stone was laid on 19 August the following year by The Duke of Edinburgh, Master of Trinity House. The supply ship Hercules was based at Oreston, now a suburb of Plymouth; stone was prepared at the Oreston yard and supplied from the works of Messrs Shearer, Smith and Co of Wadebridge. The tower, which is 49 metres (161 ft) high, contains a total of 62,133 cubic feet of granite, weighing 4,668 tons. The last stone was laid on 1 June 1881 and the light was first lit on 18 May 1882.

The lighthouse was topped by a larger than usual lantern storey, 16 ft 6 in (5.03 m) high and 14 ft (4.3 m) wide; the lantern was painted red. It contained a six-sided biform (i.e. two-tier) rotating optic of the first-order, 12 ft 6 in (3.81 m) high and weighing over seven tons. Each of the six sides of the optic was divided into two Fresnel lens panels, which provided the light's characteristic of two flashes every thirty seconds. The optic was manufactured by Chance Brothers of Smethwick and designed by their chief engineer John Hopkinson FRS. At the time the Eddystone's extra-tall (6 ft 3 in (1.91 m)) lenses were the largest in existence; their superior height was achieved through the use of extra-dense flint glass in the upper and lower portions of each panel.

The light had a range of 17 nautical miles (31 km; 20 mi). Illumination was provided by a pair of Douglass-designed six-wick concentric oil burners (one for each tier of the optic). This was said to represent 'the first practical application of superposed lenses of the first order with oil as the illuminating material'. (Note: There were in fact several optics with two or more tiers of first-order lenses already in use in lighthouses around the coast of Ireland (engineered by Douglass's great rival John Richardson Wigham), but these were lit by gas.) On clear nights, only the lamp in the lower tier of lenses was lit (producing a light of 37,000 candlepower); in poor visibility, however (judged by whether the Plymouth Breakwater light was visible), both lamps were used at full power, to provide a 159,600 candlepower light. Eighteen cisterns in the lower part of the tower were used to store up to 2,660 tons (nine months' worth) of colza oil to fuel the lamps.

In addition to the main light a fixed white light was shone from a room on the eighth storey of the tower (using a pair of Argand lamps and reflectors) in the direction of the hazardous Hand Deeps. The lighthouse was also provided with a pair of large bells, each weighing two tons, by Gillett, Bland & Co., which were suspended from either side of the lantern gallery to serve as a fog signal; they sounded (to match the light characteristic of the lighthouse) twice every thirty seconds in foggy weather, and were struck by the same clockwork mechanism that drove the rotation of the lenses. The mechanism required winding every hour (or every forty minutes, when the bells were in use), 'the weight to be lifted being equal to one ton'; shortly after opening, the lighthouse was equipped with a 0.5 h.p. caloric engine, designed 'for relieving the keepers of the excessive strain of driving the machine when both illuminating apparatus and fog bell are in use'.

=== Later modifications ===
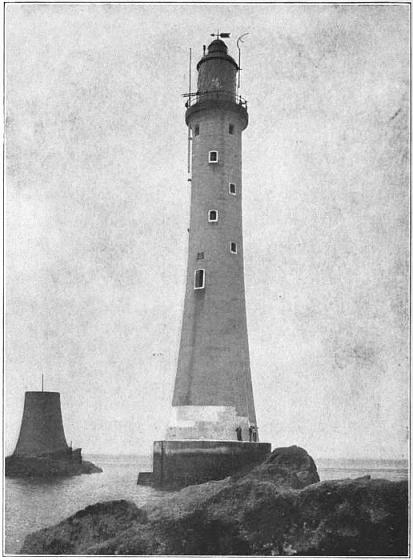
Photograph, c.1911, of Douglass's lighthouse (after removal of the bells).

In 1894 an explosive fog signal device was installed on the gallery of lighthouse; the fog bells were briefly retained as a standby provision, but then removed. In 1904 the lamps were replaced with incandescent oil vapour burners. Following the invention of the mercury bath system (allowing a lighthouse optic to revolve in a trough of mercury rather than on rollers) the Eddystone lens pedestal was duly upgraded and the drive mechanism replaced. Later, beginning in 1959, the light was electrified: the new light source was a 1,250W incandescent lamp, powered by a diesel generator (three of which were installed in a lower store room). In place of the old lenses a new, smaller (fourth-order) AGA 'bi-valve' optic was installed, which flashed at the faster rate of twice every ten seconds. The old optic was removed and donated to Southampton Maritime Museum (it was exhibited on the Royal Pier in the 1970s, but later removed to a council yard where it was destroyed by vandals). As part of the programme of modernisation, the lighthouse was given a 'SuperTyfon' fog signal, with compressors powered from the diesel generators.

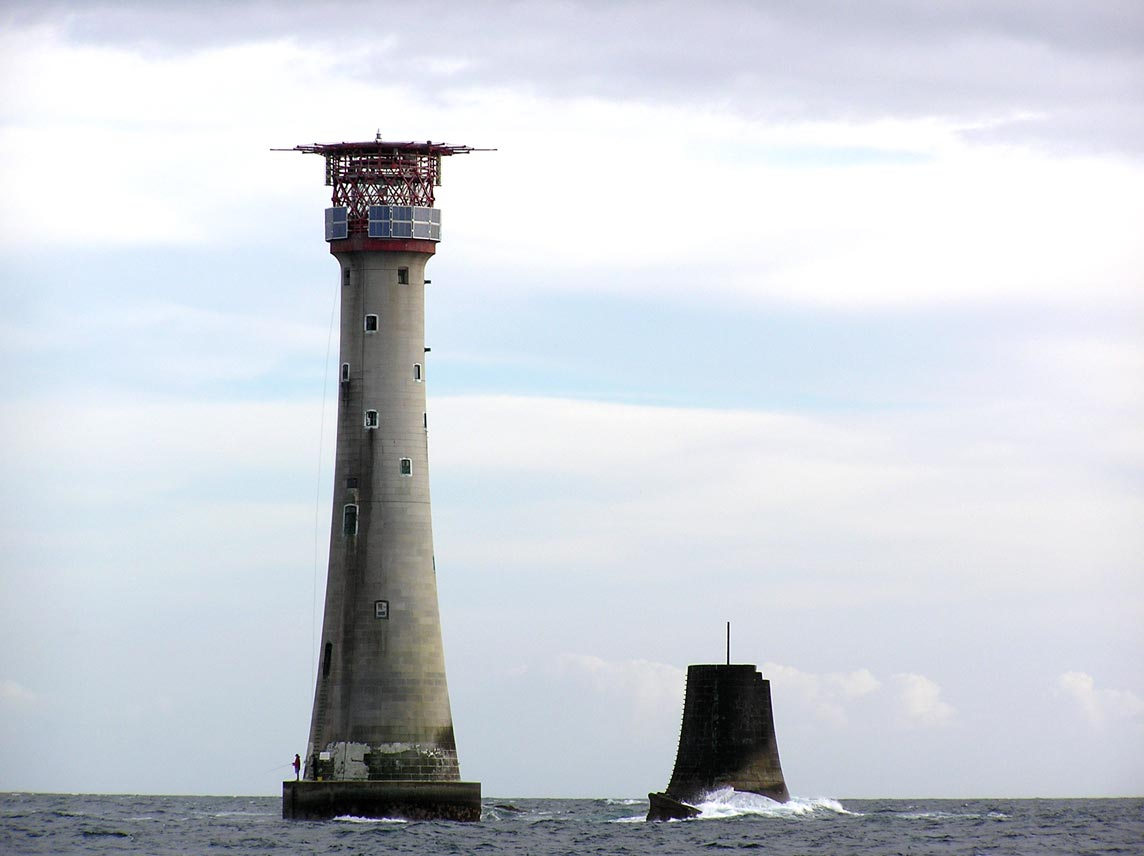
The lighthouse in 2005 (with helipad and solar panels) alongside the stub of Smeaton's Tower.

The lighthouse was automated in 1982, the first Trinity House 'Rock' (or offshore) lighthouse to be converted. Two years earlier the tower had been changed by construction of a helipad above the lantern, to allow maintenance crews access; the helipad has a weight limit of 3600 kg (3½ tons). As part of the automation of the lighthouse a new electric fog signal was installed and a metal halide discharge lamp replaced the incandescent light bulb formerly in use. The light and other systems were monitored remotely, initially by Trinity House staff at the nearby Penlee Point fog signal station. Since 1999 the lighthouse has run on solar power.

=== Present day ===
The tower is 49 metres (161 ft) high, and its white light flashes twice every 10 seconds. The light is visible to 22 nautical miles (41 km), and is supplemented by a foghorn of 3 blasts every 62 seconds. A subsidiary red sector light shines from a window in the tower to highlight the Hand Deeps hazard to the west-northwest. The lighthouse is now monitored and controlled from the Trinity House Operations Control Centre at Harwich in Essex.

== References in media ==
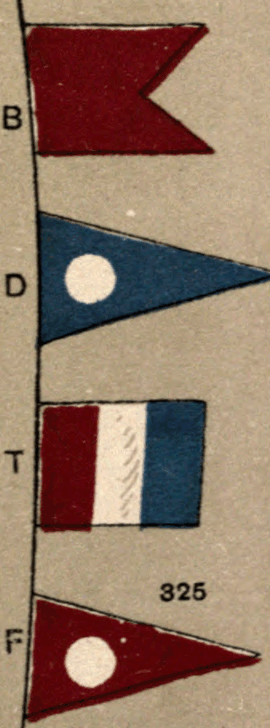
Signal-hoist for the Eddystone Light, B.D.T.F. from book, The Flags of the World, 1896

- The lighthouse inspired a sea shanty, frequently recorded, that begins "My father was the keeper of the Eddystone light / He courted a mermaid one fine night / From this union there came three / A porpoise and a porgy and the other was me!" There are several verses.
- The lighthouse has been used as a metaphor for stability.
- In the Goon Show episode Ten Snowballs that shook the World (1958), Neddie Seagoon is sent to Eddystone Lighthouse to warn the inhabitants that Sterling has dropped from F-sharp to E-flat.
- The lighthouse is celebrated in the opening and closing movements of Ron Goodwin's Drake 400 Suite. The movement's main theme was directly inspired by the lighthouse's unique light characteristic.
- Smeaton's Tower, a novel based on the building of Smeaton's lighthouse, containing many details of its construction, was published in 2005.
- The lighthouse is referenced twice in Herman Melville's epic novel Moby-Dick; at the beginning of Chapter 14, "Nantucket": "How it stands there, away off shore, more lonely than the Eddystone lighthouse.", and in Chapter 133, "The Chase – First Day": "So, in a gale, the but half baffled Channel billows only recoil from the base of the Eddystone, triumphantly to overleap its summit with their scud."
- The lighthouse is referred to in "Daddy was a Ballplayer" by the Canadian band Stringband, and follows a similar line to the sea shanty.
- "The Most Famous of All Lighthouses," the third chapter of The Story of Lighthouses (Norton 1965) by Mary Ellen Chase, is devoted to the Eddystone Lighthouse.
- Eddystone Lighthouse was used for many of the exterior shots in The Phantom Light, a 1935 film directed by Michael Powell.
- The English pop group Edison Lighthouse took its name from it. Later, 'Lighthouse' was discarded, and they renamed themselves 'Edison'.
- An 1850 replica of Smeaton's lighthouse, Hoad Monument, stands above the town of Ulverston, Cumbria as a memorial to naval administrator Sir John Barrow.

== See also ==
- List of lighthouses in England
- Eddystone, the Google Bluetooth Low Energy beacon
- Hook Lighthouse, second oldest lighthouse in the world and oldest in the British Isles
