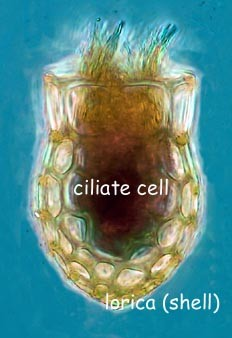

Scientific classification
- Domain: Eukaryota
- Clade: Sar
- Clade: Alveolata
- Phylum: Ciliophora
- Class: Spirotrichea
- Subclass: Choreotrichia
- Order: Tintinnida; Kofoid & Campbell, 1929

= Tintinnid =

Order of single-celled organisms

Tintinnids are ciliates of the choreotrich order Tintinnida, the name deriving from a Latin source meaning a small tinkling bell. They are distinguished by vase-shaped shells called loricae, which are mostly protein but may incorporate minute pieces of minerals.

== Fossil record ==
Possible fossil tintinnids from the Precambrian were discovered in 2007, but were later reassessed as deformed acritarchs; thus, the earliest found fossil tintinnids are from the Ordovician and Devonian periods. Fossils resembling tintinnid loricas in shape and size, calpionellids, appear during the Tithonian period but are formed of calcite and as no extant ciliate taxa forms calcite shells they are unlikely to be tintinnids and probably not ciliates at all. Fossils which can be reliably related to extant tintinnids (e.g. fossils of agglutinated lorica) are in the fossil record during the Jurassic but do not become abundant until the Cretaceous. Tintinnids are an important part of the fossil record because of the rarity with which most other ciliates become preserved under the conditions of the marine environment. The loricae of some tintinnids are easily preserved, giving them a relatively good fossil record.

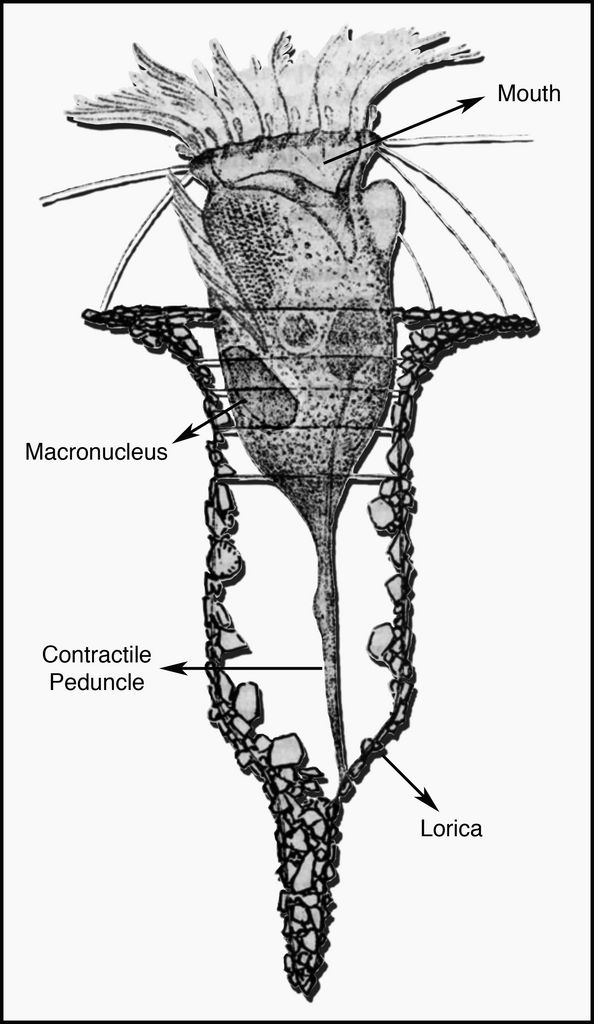
Adaptation of a cut-away drawing of Tintinnopsis campanula by Fauré-Fremiet (1924) showing basic tintinnid morphology. Tintinnid taxonomy classically is based on characteristics of the lorica or shell. Species in the same genus share similar lorica architecture. For example, species in the genus Tintinnopsis all have lorica covered with small mineral particles, one end is closed, and do not have any clear (hyaline) spines or collars as part of the lorica.

== Description ==
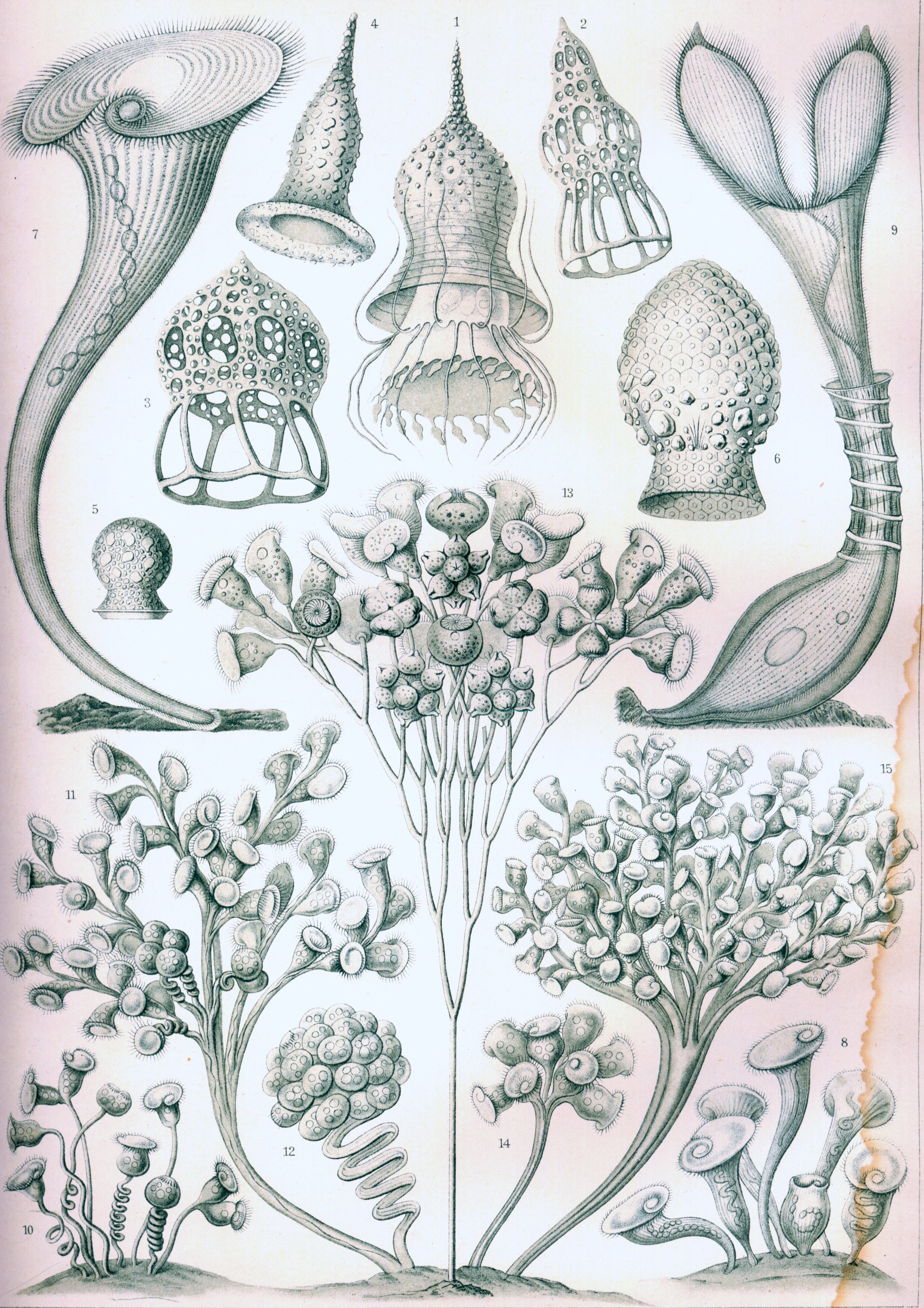
Haeckel Ciliata

Tintinnid loricas or shells show an amazing variety of styles. They were among the many planktonic microorganisms featured in Ernst's Haeckel's classic work popularizing the beauty of the natural world "Art forms in Nature" (Kunstformen der Natur).

Like other protists, tintinnids are complex single-celled eukaryotic organisms. Tintinnids are heterotrophic aquatic organisms. They feed primarily on photosynthetic algae and bacteria. They are part of the microzooplankton (between 20 and 200 micrometres in size). Tintinnids are found in marine and freshwaters. However, they are most common in salt water and are usually present in concentrations of about 100 a liter but can reach abundances of several thousand per litre. Characteristics of their lorica, or shells, are classically used to distinguish the roughly 1000 species described. However, in recent years application of histological and molecular techniques have led to many taxonomic revisions.

Many species appear to have wide distributions (for example from the Chesapeake Bay to New Caledonia) while others are restricted to certain areas, such as arctic waters or coastal seas. Nonetheless, in any given locale dozens of species can be found. Like other members of the microzooplankton (such as oligotrich ciliates, heterotrophic dinoflagellates, radiolarians, etc.), tintinnids are a vital link in aquatic food chains as they are the 'herbivores' of the plankton. They feed on phytoplankton (algae and cyanobacteria) and in turn act as food for larger organisms such as copepods (small crustaceans) and larval fish.

The color image on the right is a specimen of Dictyocysta mitra from the Bay of Villefranche in the Mediterranean Sea. The hair-like projections pointing out of the top of the shell are the cilia of the cell. The cilia generate a water flow across the mouth of the cell, bringing food into contact and move the tintinnid. Their swimming pattern is rather 'jumpy'- or dancing- they are part of the 'choreotrichs' which means dancing hairs from their swimming behaviour and cilia.

== Gallery ==
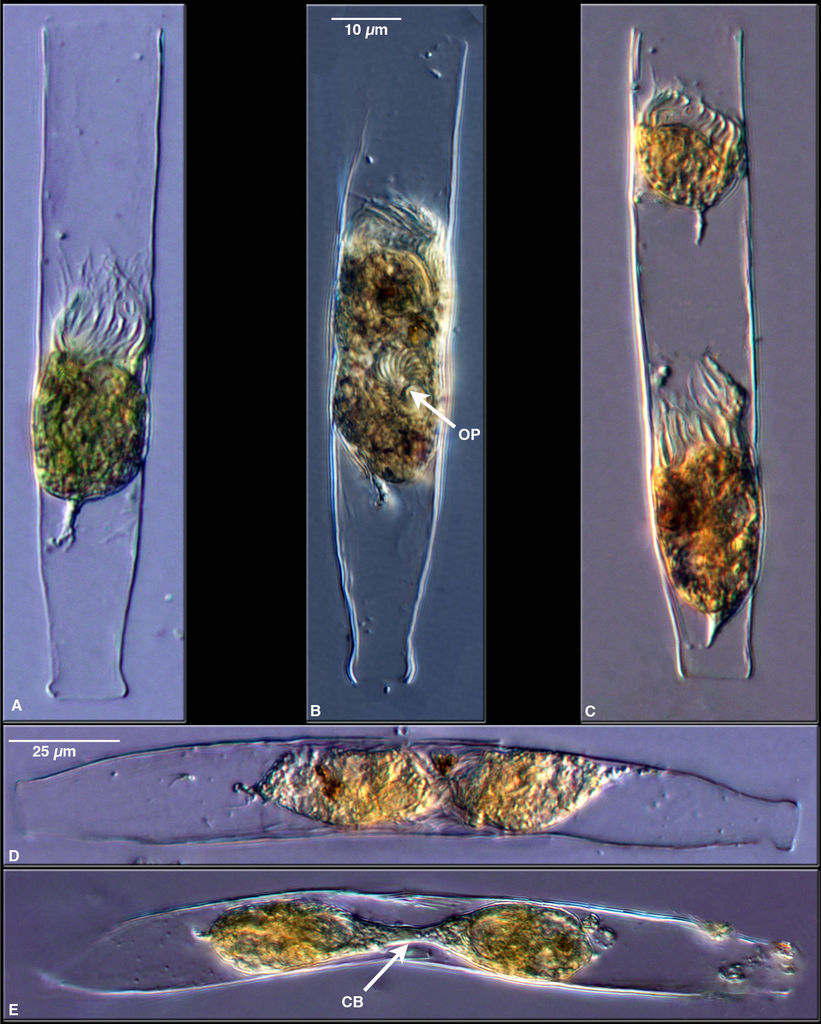
Life history stages of a tintinnid, Eutintinnus inquilinus. In ciliates reproduction (B&C) is divorced from sexual recombination (D&E).

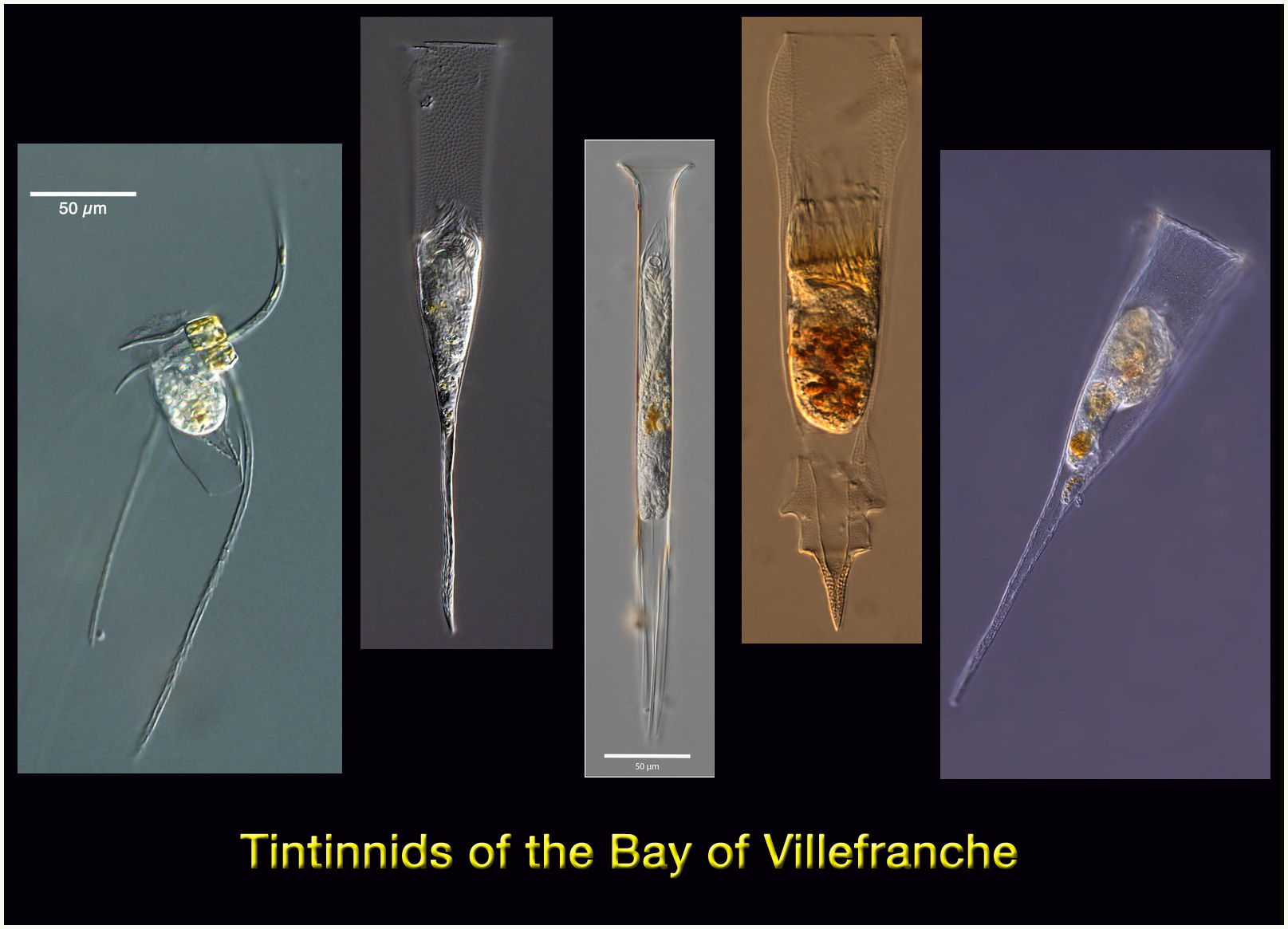
Living cells from the Bay of Villefranche (N.W. Mediterranean Sea)

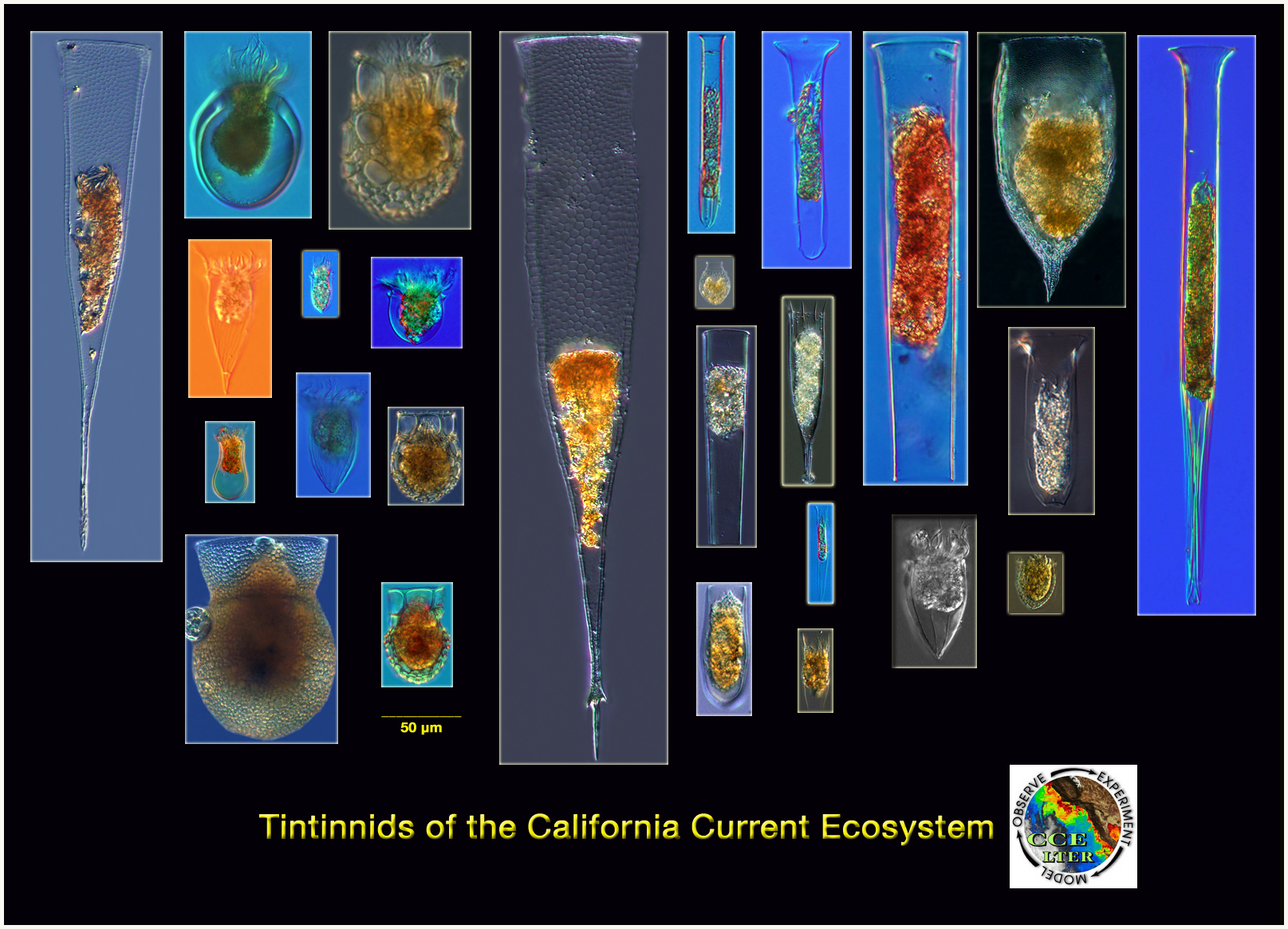
Tintinnids of the California Current Ecosystem

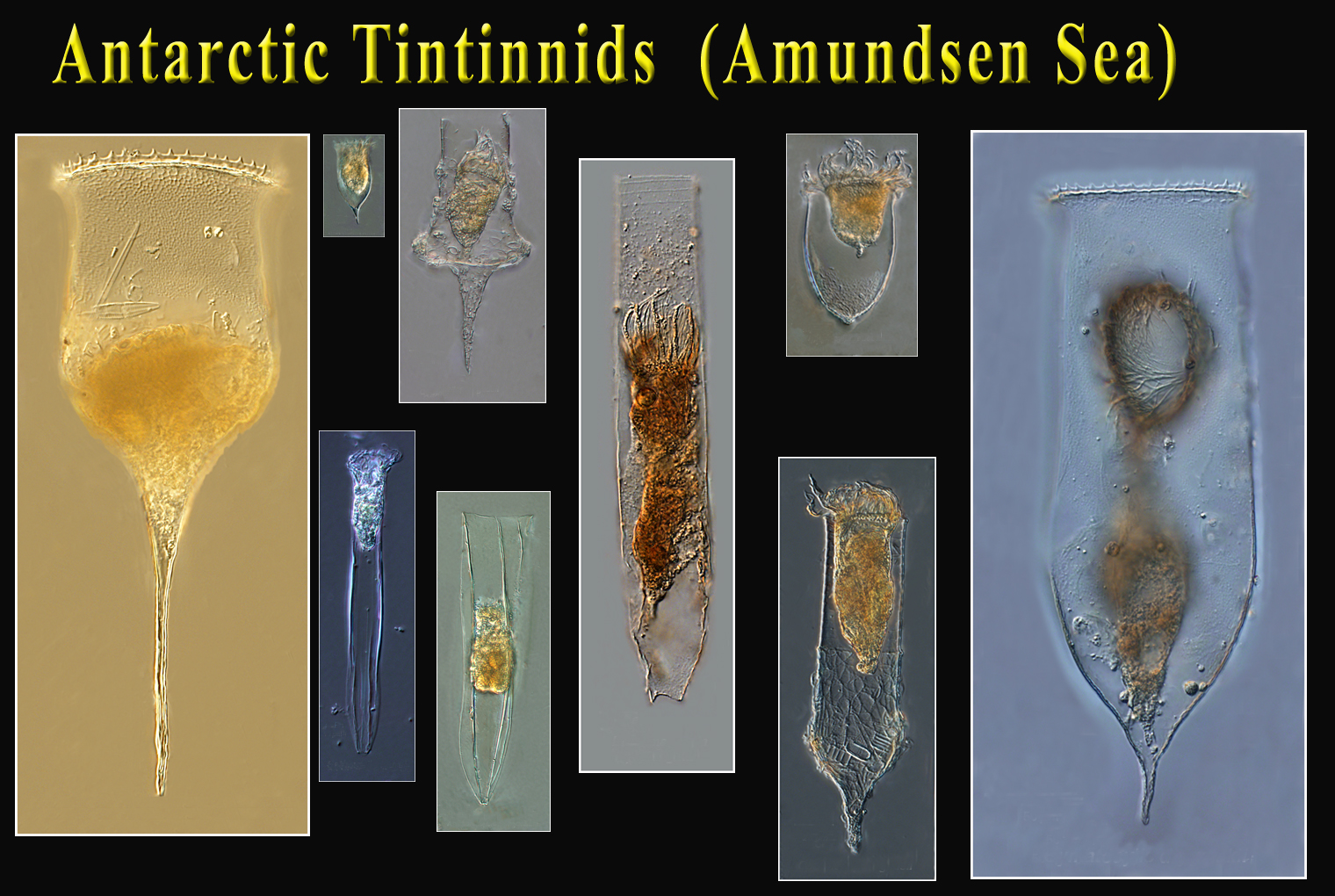
Amundsen Sea (Antarctica) Tintinnids

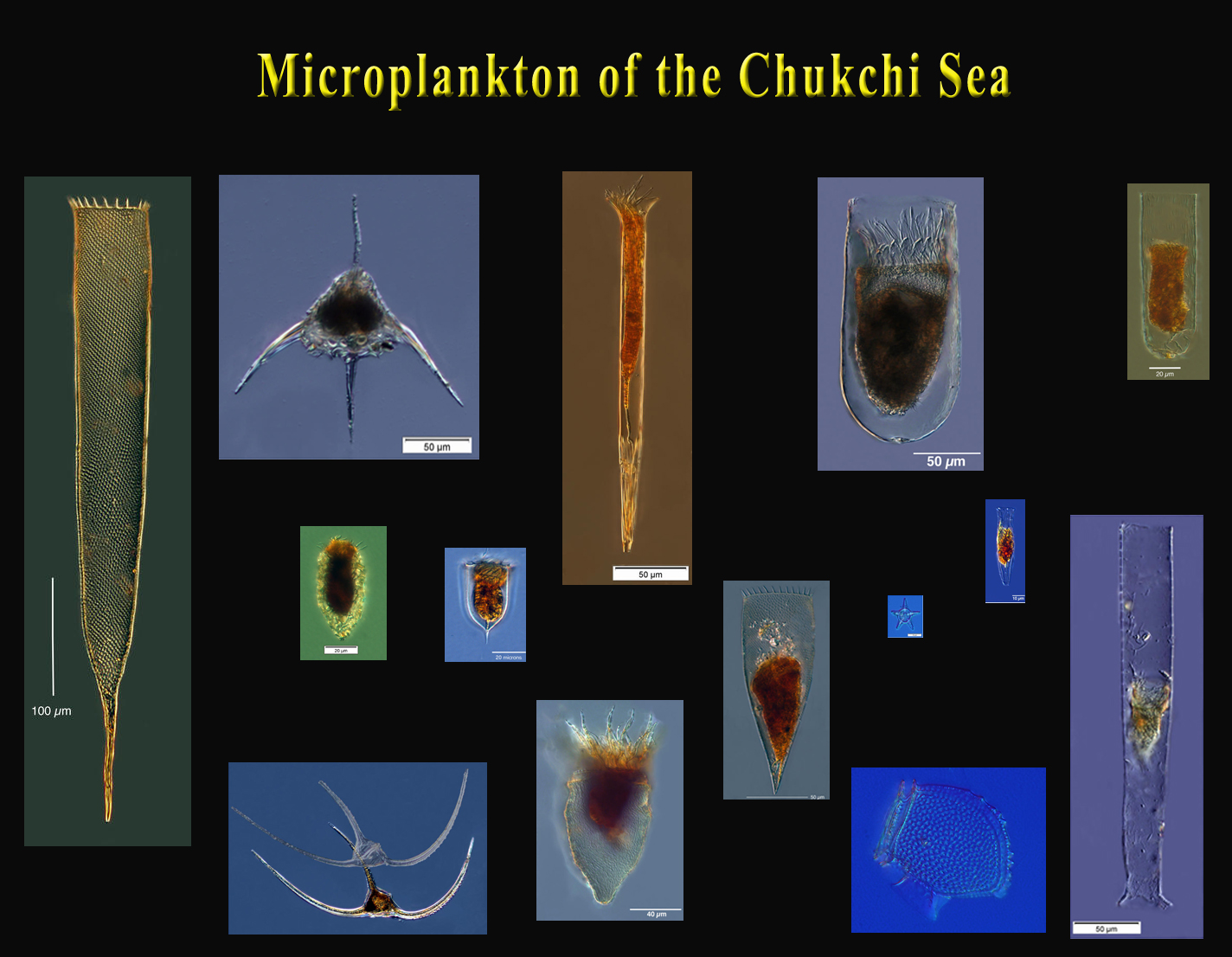
Images of tintinnids and other microplankton found in the Chukchi Sea in the Arctic

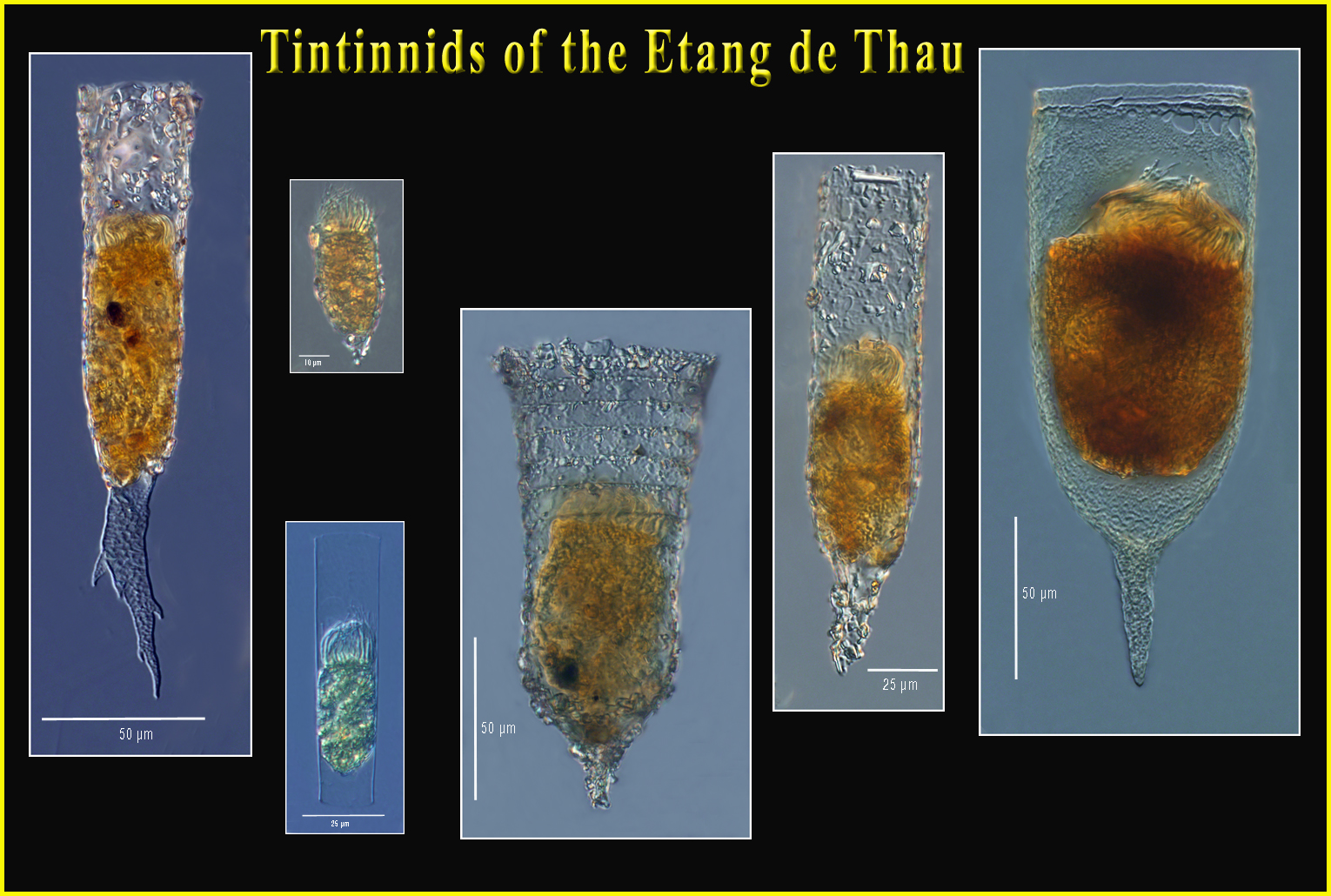
Tintinnids of the Thau Lagoon (Sète, France)

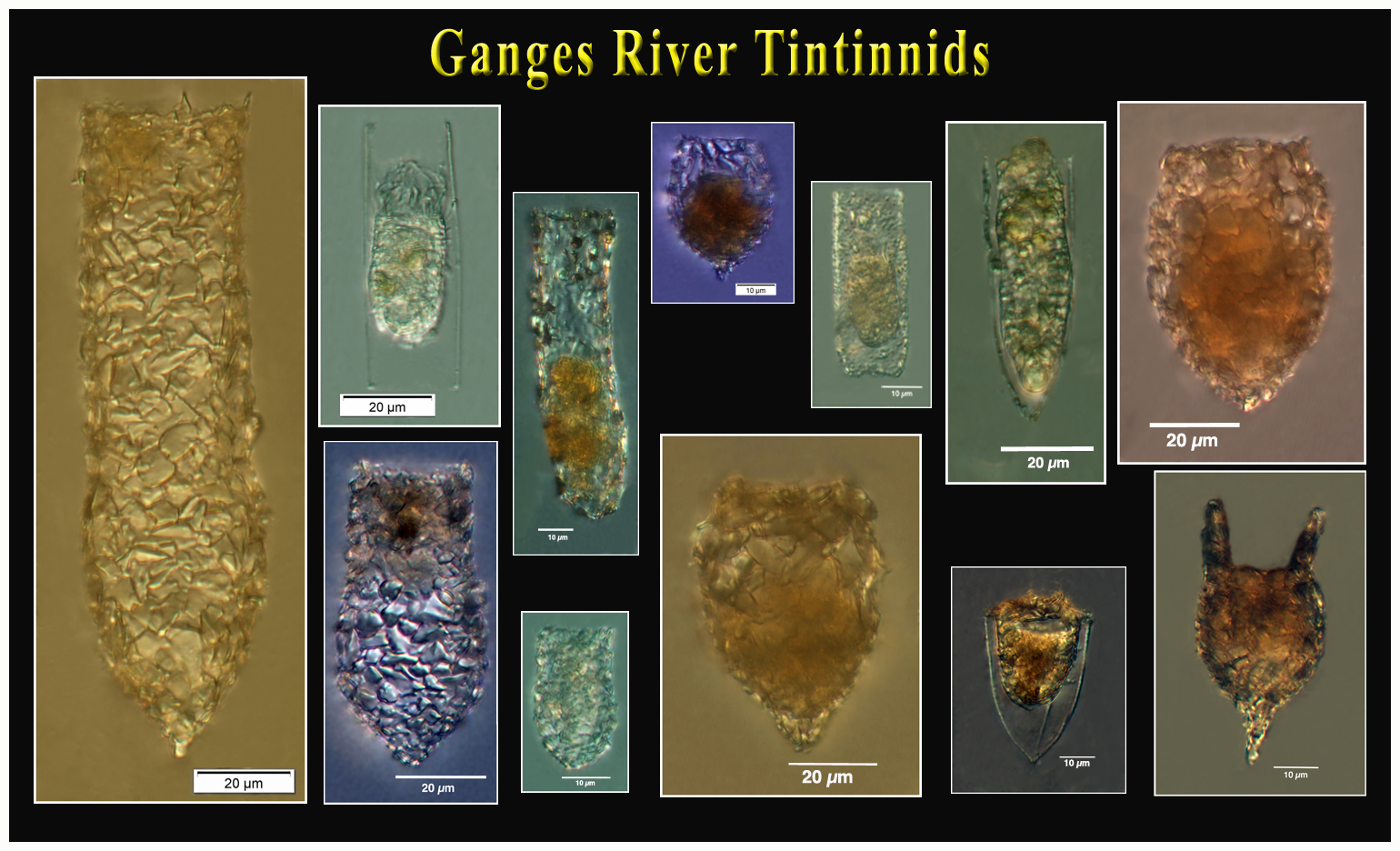
Tintinnids from the estuarine region of the Ganges River in India
