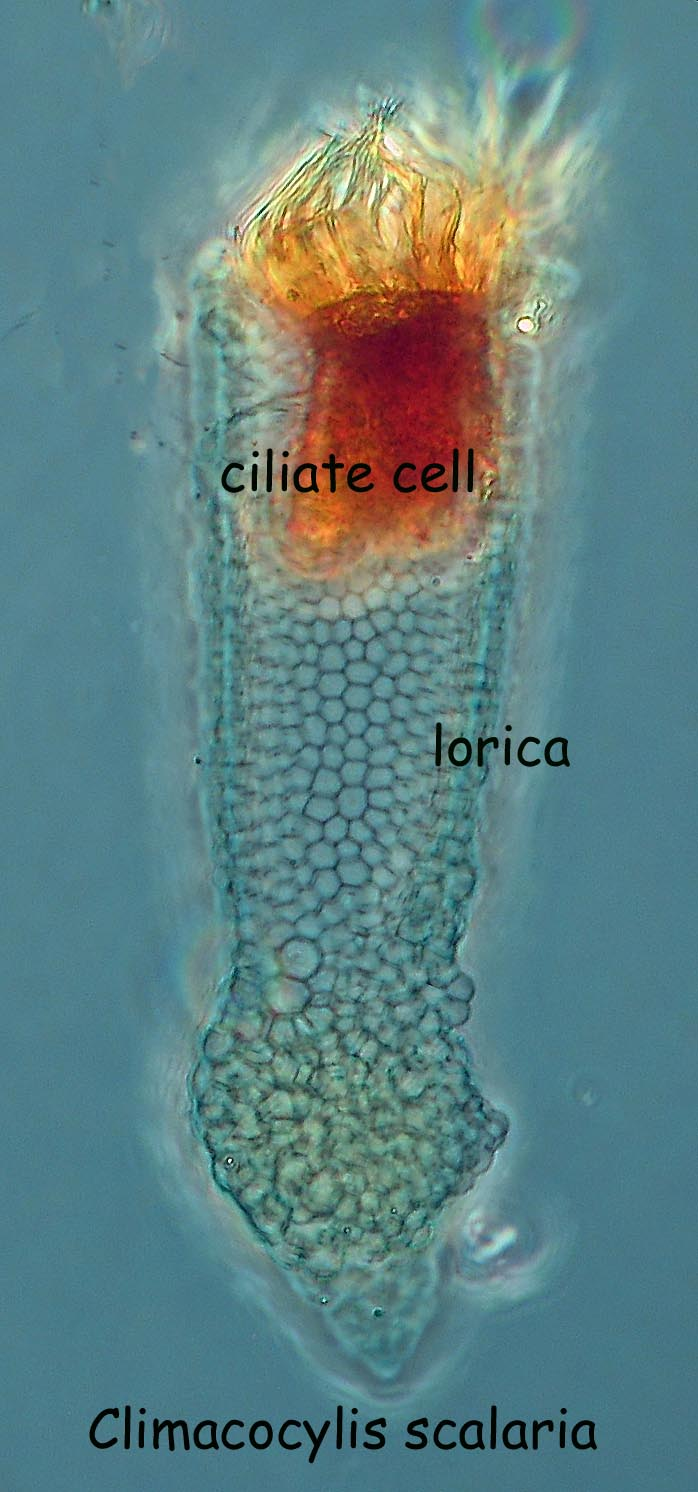
- A tintinnid

Scientific classification
- Domain: Eukaryota
- Clade: Sar
- Superphylum: Alveolata
- Phylum: Ciliophora
- Class: Spirotrichea
- Subclass: Choreotrichia; Small & Lynn 1985

Typical orders
- Choreotrichida; Tintinnida

= Choreotrich =

Subclass of single-celled organisms

The choreotrichs are a group of small marine ciliates. Their name reflects the impression that they appear to dance ('choreo' as in choreography). The group includes the tintinnids, which produce species-specific loricae (shells), and are important because these may be preserved as microfossils. The cyst forms have been suggested to be affiliated to Chitinozoans, although other studies suggest Chitinozoans to have affinities to larger marine animals, and not tintinnids. Often they have been included among the oligotrichs. Tintinnids seem to be an excessively specious group as over 400 living species have been described, based on characteristics of the lorica or shell.

Choreotrichs (including tintinnids) are part of the microzooplankton. Generally small (20–200 micrometres in size) organisms found in the plankton. They feed on small algae and serve as prey for larger organisms in the plankton such as copepods and larval fish.
