= Laboea =

Scientific classification
- Domain: Eukaryota
- Clade: Sar
- Clade: Alveolata
- Phylum: Ciliophora
- Class: Spirotrichea
- Order: Strombidiida
- Family: Strombidiidae
- Genus: Laboea; Lohmann, 1908

Type species
- Loboea strobilia Lohmann, 1908

Genus of spirotrich

Laboea is a genus of oligotrich ciliates widely distributed in coastal marine waters. It can reach high abundances, particularly in the upper water column during periods of strong thermal stratification.

This genus exhibits mixotrophic characteristics. Laboea feeds on microplankton while retaining photosynthetic chloroplasts from the algae it consumes. Even when external food is abundant, L. strobila relies on the nutrients provided by these retained chloroplasts to sustain its survival, indicating that photosynthesis plays a critical role in its energy acquisition.

Morphologically, Laboea is characterized by its distinctive spiral-shaped cells and a well-developed oral region with an AZM featuring making polykinetids. Its cytoplasm contains numerous Heptose.

== Etymology ==
The etymology of the genus Laboea is not explicitly stated in the original description of the genus, but the German zoologist Haus Lohmann, the author of the genus, was active in the German town of Laboea, on the Kiel fjord. Presumably the genus is named after the town.

== History of knowledge ==
Laboea strobila was first discovered by Lohmann in 1908 along the German coast, and its morphology and distribution were described using an optical microscope. However, its mixtrophic characteristics were not identified at that time. In 1919, Wulff classified it into the genus Strombidium based on an analysis of its mouthparts and ciliary arrangement.

In 1969–1970, Fauré-Fremiet recognized the taxonomic significance of the spiral ring through improved staining techniques. In Laboea strobila, the ring band typically spirals counterclockwise for approximately 4.5 turns, whereas closely related Strombidium species exhibit only about 3.0–3.5 turns. Differences in the number of spiral turns and their degree of development provide clear criteria for distinguishing Laboea from Strombidium.

In the 1980s, researchers discovered that L. strobila contains functional chloroplasts. In 1988, Stoecker established its mixtrophic metabolism.

== Description ==
=== Morphology ===
Laboea strobila has a conical overall shape, measuring 60–130 µm in length and 20–65 µm in width. The cell has a conical collar at its anterior end, with an apical protrusion at the tip, the posterior end is obconical and tapers gradually. The cell surface is surrounded with a 4–5 turns left-handed girdle kinety, encircling approximately 70% of the cell's length. The oral apparatus is located at the anterior end of the cell and consists of a well-developed adoral zone of membranelles, forming a characteristic C-shaped structure.

The cell cortex is composed of polygonal cortical platelets, giving the surface a reticulated structure. The cytoplasm contains numerous lipid droplets and captured chloroplasts. It possesses multiple, widely distributed macronuclear nodules, and micronuclei. Extrusomes are clustered along the ring of cilia, gradually decreasing in size toward the rear; upon release, they form slender filamentous structures.

This organism exhibits spiral swimming at a moderate speed, rotating along the cell's longitudinal axis. During movement, it may follow a zigzag path and can execute evasive maneuvers through rapid backward swimming.

=== Metabolism ===
Laboea strobila exhibits a mixotrophic metabolicsm. If retains the chloroplasts from ingested cryptophytes to perform photosynthesis on which it is highly dependent. Under adequate light conditions, photosynthesis can provide approximately 12% of the cell's carbon per hour. However, these chloroplasts cannot maintain their function over the long term and must be continuously replenished through feeding.

=== Distinguishing features ===
Laboea strobila is morphologically very similar to Spirotontonia grandis. The difference lies in the absence of a caudal tuft in Laboea strobila. Furthermore, the cortical platelets of S. grandis often overlap in a head-to-tail fashion, whereas those of L. strobila do not. In terms of movement, S. grandis swims more slowly and lacks the rapid backward escape behavior commonly observed in L. strobila.

== Habitat and ecology ==
Laboea strobila is widely distributed in marine environments, including the North Atlantic, the North Sea, the Baltic Sea, the Mediterranean Sea, the Arctic Ocean, and parts of the Pacific Ocean. It shows strong vertical gradients in the water column. This species can tolerate a wide range of environmental conditions, including temperatures of 0–30°C and salinities of 2–38‰. The physiological activities of Laboea strobila (such as feeding) follow a diurnal pattern, with abundance being lowest at night and peaking in the afternoon. In contrast, its photosynthetic rate peaks at midday and is lower in the morning and evening.

== List of species ==
The following species are assigned to the genus:

- Laboea acuminatum
- Laboea capitatum
- Laboea compressum
- Laboea conica Lohmann, 1908
- Laboea conicum Lohmann, 1908
- Laboea cornucopiae
- Laboea globosa
- Laboea pulchrum (Kopperi, 1937) Corliss, 1960
- Laboea reticulatum
- Laboea striata Meunier, 1910
- Laboea strobilia Lohmann, 1908
