= Hand Deeps =

Area of the English Channel off the south coast of Cornwall

Coordinates: 50°12.555′N 04°20.410′W

Hand Deeps is an area of the English Channel located 8 nautical miles (15 km; 9.2 mi) south-west of Rame Head, Cornwall and 3.5 nautical miles (6.5 km; 4.0 mi) north-west of the Eddystone. The name comes from the five pinnacles there which rise from the surrounding sea bed depth of 55 metres to depth between 7 and 19 metres from the surface. The pinnacles are within a rectangle about 1 nautical mile (1.9 km; 1.2 mi) north-south and 0.5 nautical miles (0.93 km; 0.58 mi) west-east.

The central pinnacle rises from more than 40 metres to 7 metres. Its sea anemone-covered walls and frequent good visibility make it a popular dive site.
