= Fred Majdalany =

British military veteran and author

Fareed Majdalany (1913-1967), also known as Fred Majdalany, was a British military veteran and author. He published Patrol (1935), The Red Rocks of Eddystone (1959), The Fall of Fortress Europe (1968), and Cassino: Portrait of a Battle (1957).
