= Souter Lighthouse =

Lighthouse in South Tyneside, England

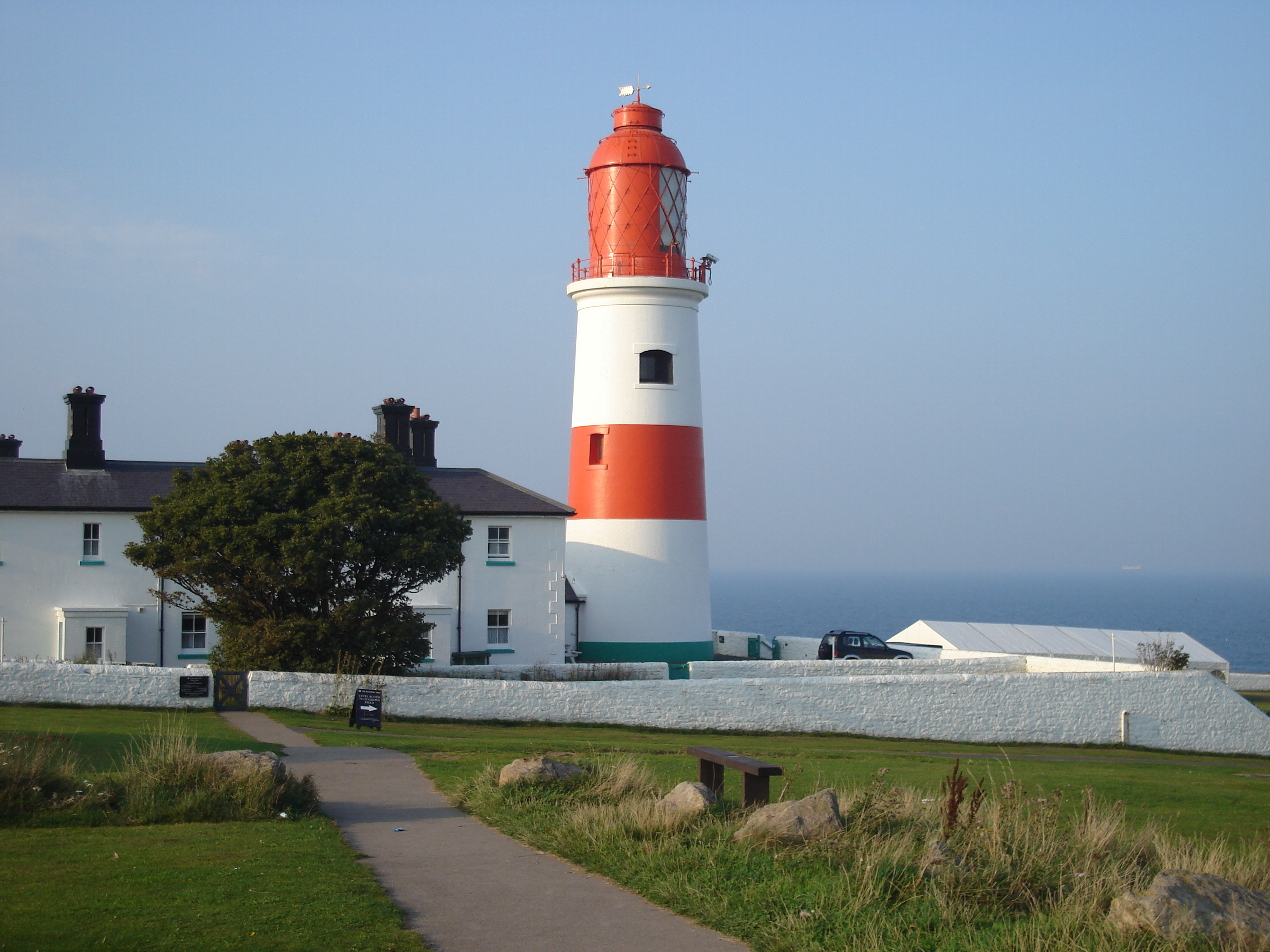
- Souter Lighthouse viewed from the south-west.
- Location: Whitburn, Tyne and Wear
- OS grid: NZ4080764169
- Coordinates: 54°58′14″N 1°21′51″W

Tower
- Constructed: 1871
- Construction: brick (tower)
- Height: 23 m (75 ft)
- Shape: cylinder
- Markings: White (tower), red (stripe), red (lantern)
- Operator: Trinity House (–1988), National Trust (1990–)
- Heritage: Grade II* listed building
- Fog signal: One blast every 30s

Light
- First lit: 11 January 1871
- Deactivated: 1988
- Lens: third order Fresnel lens (1871–1914), first order Fresnel lens (1914–)
- Range: 26 nmi (48 km; 30 mi)
- Characteristic: Fl R 5s

Souter Lighthouse is a lighthouse located to the North of Whitburn, South Tyneside, England. (It was generally known as Souter Point Lighthouse when in service). Souter Point was the first lighthouse in the world to be actually designed and built specifically to use alternating electric current, the most advanced lighthouse technology of its day. The light was generated by a carbon arc lamp: first lit on 11 January 1871, it was described at the time as "without doubt one of the most powerful lights in the world".

After being decommissioned by Trinity House (the national lighthouse authority) in 1988, Souter Lighthouse was acquired by the National Trust, who now manage it as a visitor attraction with holiday lets.

== Location ==
The lighthouse is located on Lizard Point, but takes its name from Souter Point, which is located a mile to the south. This was the intended site for the lighthouse, but it was felt that Lizard Point offered better visibility, as the cliffs there are higher, so the lighthouse was built there instead. The Souter Lighthouse name was retained in order to avoid confusion with the then recently built Lizard Lighthouse in Cornwall.

Souter Lighthouse is approximately three miles south of the mouth of the River Tyne. Some four miles or so to the north of the mouth of the Tyne is a sister Victorian lighthouse, St Mary's Lighthouse, on St Mary's Island. It has also been decommissioned, and is open to visitors. St Mary's Lighthouse can be seen with the naked eye from the top of Souter Lighthouse.

== History ==
The lighthouse was a much-needed aid to navigation due to the number of wrecks on the dangerous reefs of Whitburn Steel which lay directly under the water in the surrounding area. In one year alone – 1860 – there were 20 shipwrecks. This contributed to making this coastline the most dangerous in the country, with an average of around 44 shipwrecks per every mile of coastline.

=== 19th century ===
==== Construction ====
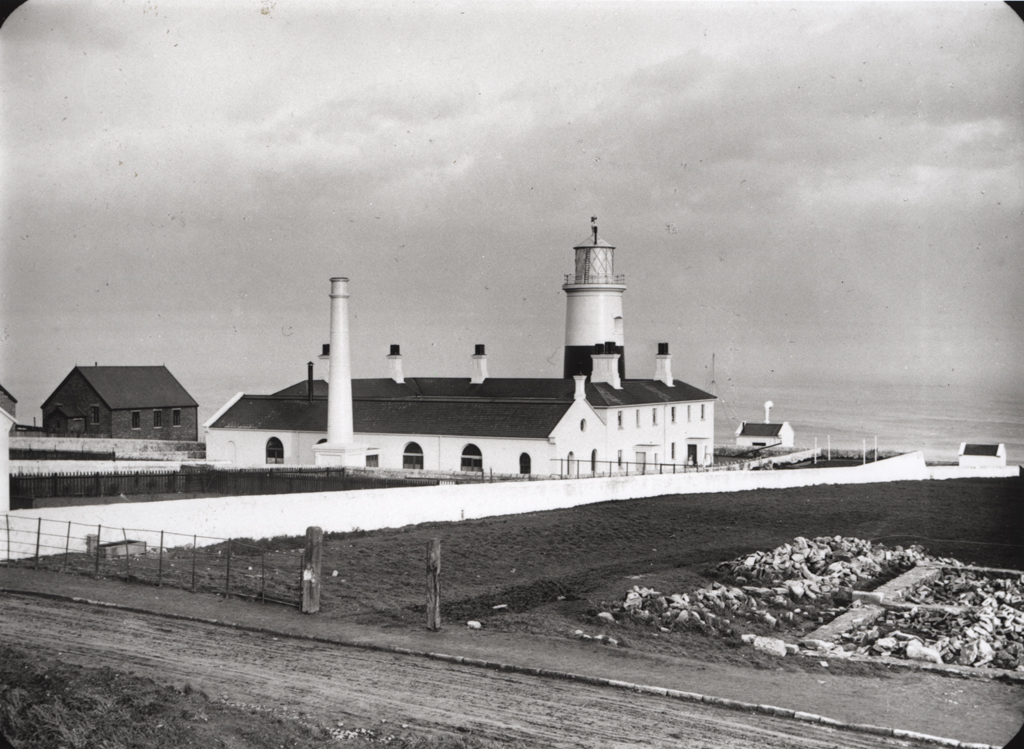
The lighthouse c. 1900.

The lighthouse and associated buildings were designed for Trinity House by their Chief Engineer, James Douglass; its construction was supervised by on-site engineer Henry Norris. Alongside the lighthouse tower a number of other buildings were laid out around a quadrangle, including the engine room and boiler house, and five dwellings; all were built of rubble masonry, rendered with Portland cement. The contract for building the lighthouse and keepers' cottages was reported in March 1869 as being £8,000 and was awarded to the local firm of James Todd, after complaints that local builders had not had the opportunity to reply to tender as it had not been advertised locally. The foundation stone was ceremonially laid by Admiral Collinson's sister on 9 June 1869. Building works were completed in 1870, and the lighthouse entered service in January the following year. After completing this project Douglass and Norris moved on to the building of Hartland Point Lighthouse in Devon.

==== Electricity ====
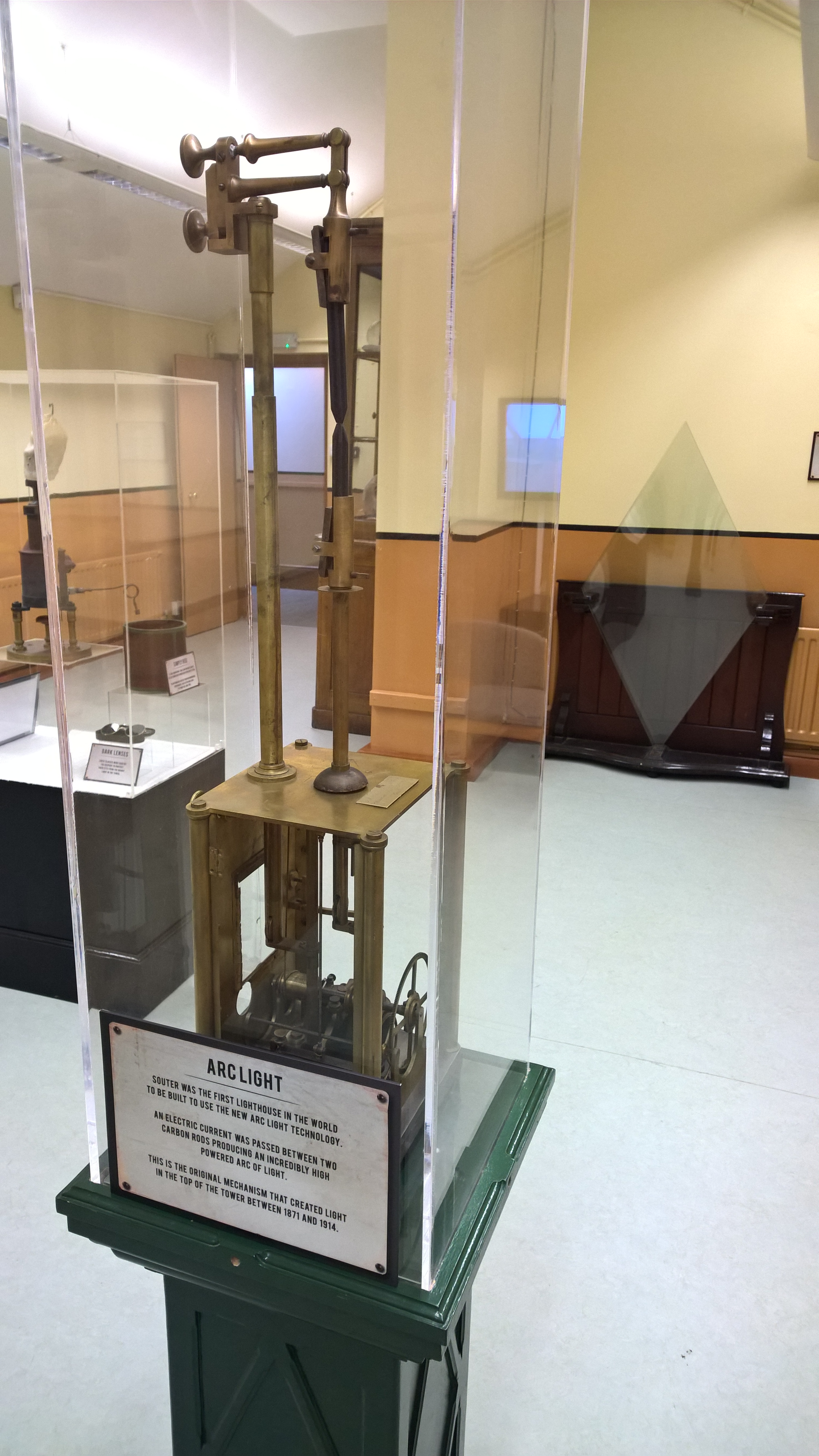
The original arc lamp assembly, in use from 1871-1914, now on display in the lighthouse visitor centre.

Carbon arc lights for lighthouses were pioneered by Professor Frederick Hale Holmes, with experiments carried out in 1857–1860 at Blackwall and at South Foreland Lighthouse (as described in a lecture by Michael Faraday at the Royal Institution). An initial installation at Dungeness Lighthouse in 1862 had proved problematic, however, with frequent failures of the lamps and machinery; so Trinity House carried out an extensive testing and selection process over five years (including comparisons with oil lights and examination of equipment in Britain and France) before finalising its plans for a complete purpose-built electric installation at Souter.

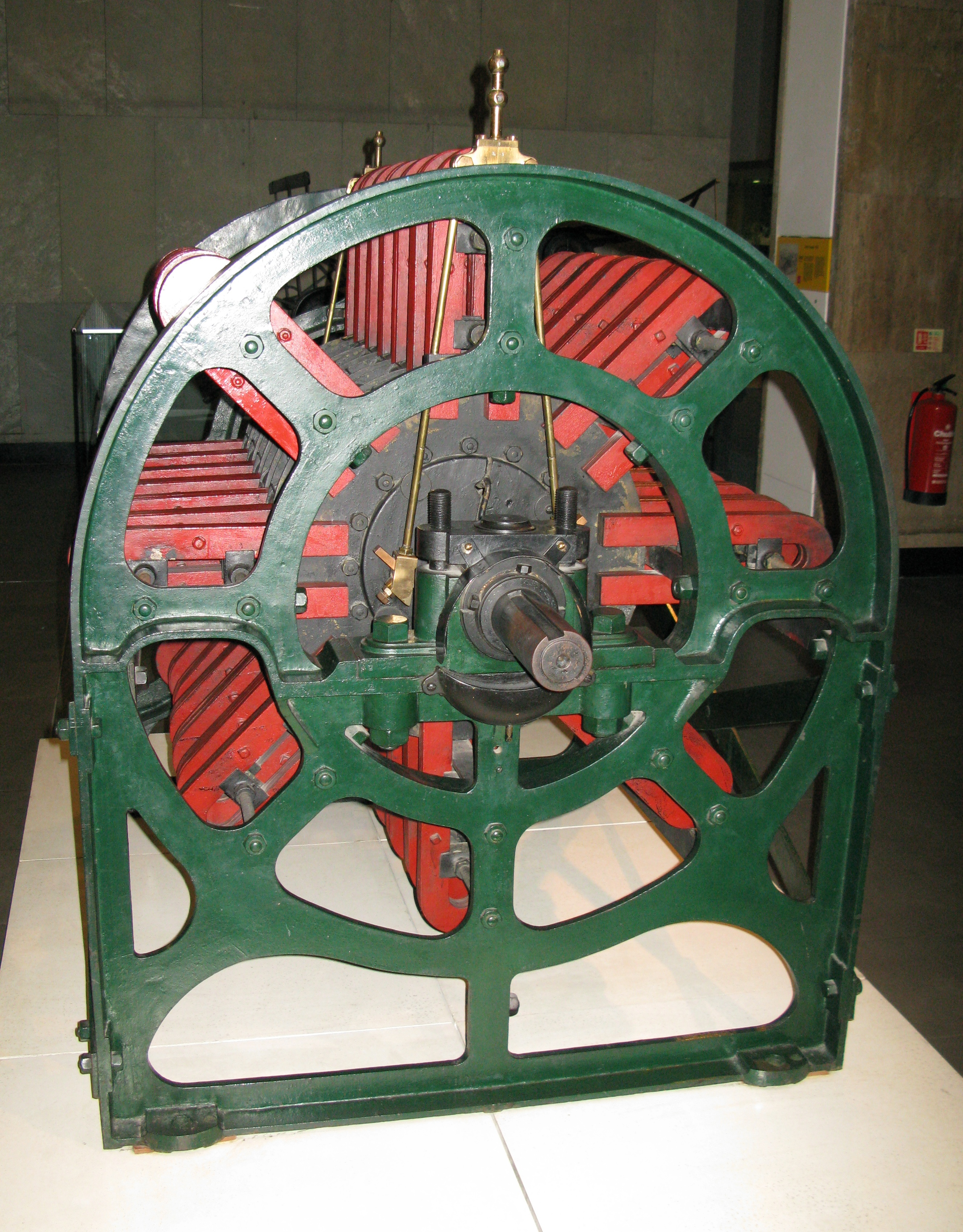
One of the original magneto-electric generators from Souter Lighthouse (now part of 'Making the Modern World' in the Science Museum, London)

The carbon arc lamp at Souter was placed within a lens array consisting of a third-order fixed catadioptric optic surrounded by a revolving assembly of eight vertical condensing-prisms which produced one bright flash every thirty seconds. Its 800,000 candle power light could be seen for up to 26 miles. The optics were designed and built by James Chance in 1870.

In addition to the main light a red/white sector light shone from a window in the tower below the lantern, to highlight hazards to the south in Sunderland Bay (namely Hendon Rock and the White Stones); it was powered using light diverted (through a set of mirrors and lenses) from the landward side of the main arc lamp.

Electricity for the light was provided by two of Holmes' own magneto electric generators for which he took out a series of patents during those years. In normal operation only one generator was used, but in conditions of poor visibility both were connected to the lamp to provide a brighter light. The generators were driven by one of a pair of J. Whitworth & Co. 5 nhp 'Allen' condensing steam engines. (Prior to being installed at Souter, the engines and generators were exhibited by Trinity House at the Paris Exposition of 1867.) The engines were worked alternately: one week on, one week off. Located in the engine-house, they also drove an air-pump to feed the pressure tank of a foghorn.

In December 1891 the lighthouse tower was painted with a broad red band, to make it more conspicuous during the day.

==== Foghorn ====
Holmes also designed a reed fog signal for the new lighthouse, sounded from a separate foghorn house (east of the tower) through a pair of vertical trumpets (angled north-east and south-east, facing out to sea). It sounded one blast every 45 seconds. Compressed air for the foghorn was piped underground from the engine room, on the other side of the lighthouse, where the air compressor was driven by a common drive shaft from the engines powering the magnetos.

A more powerful siren fog signal replaced the reeds in February 1879; it sounded one blast every minute. It required an additional and more powerful engine, which was installed in the engine room to drive the compressor for the new signal.

==== Charts and engineering (1875) ====
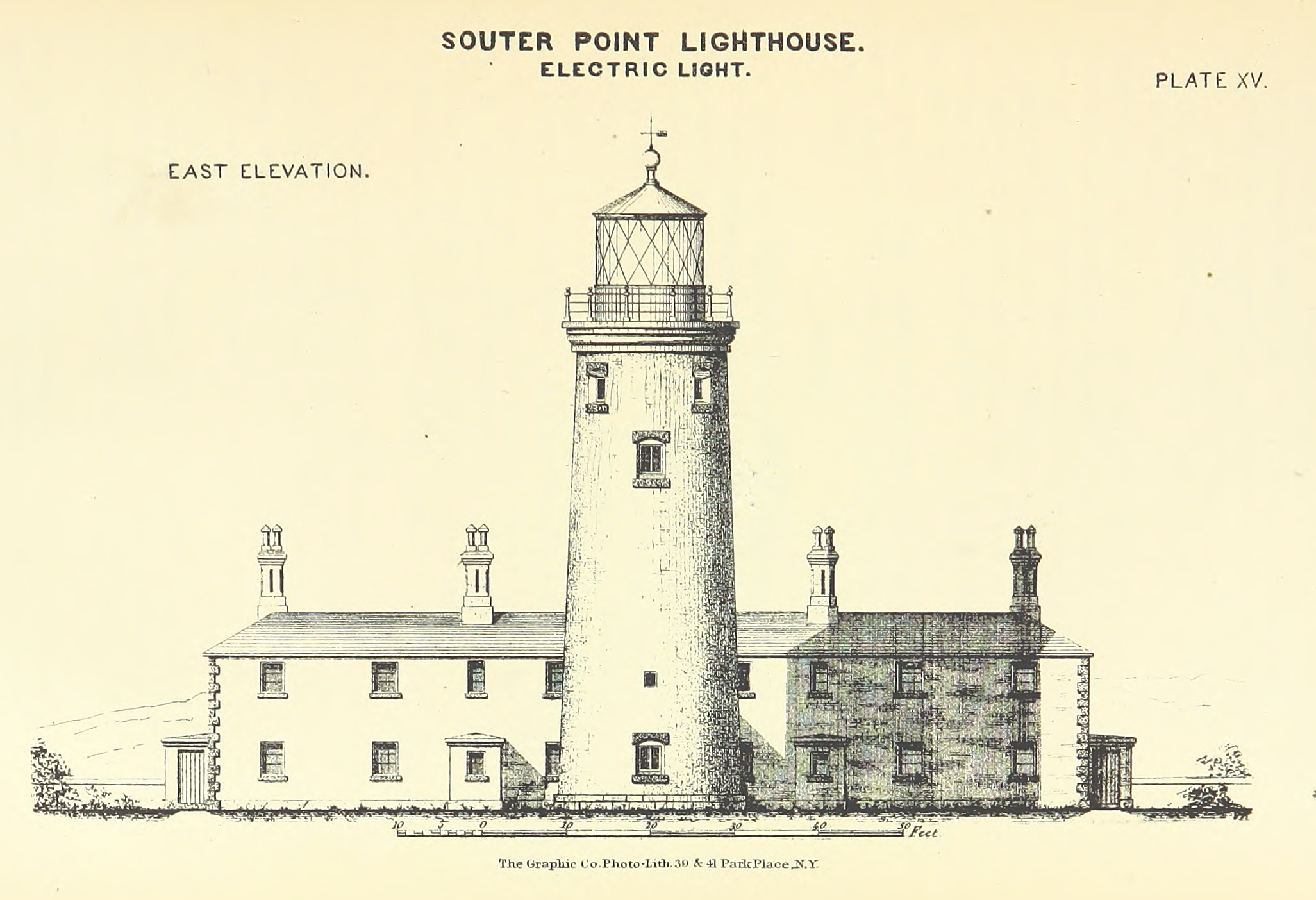
East Elevation

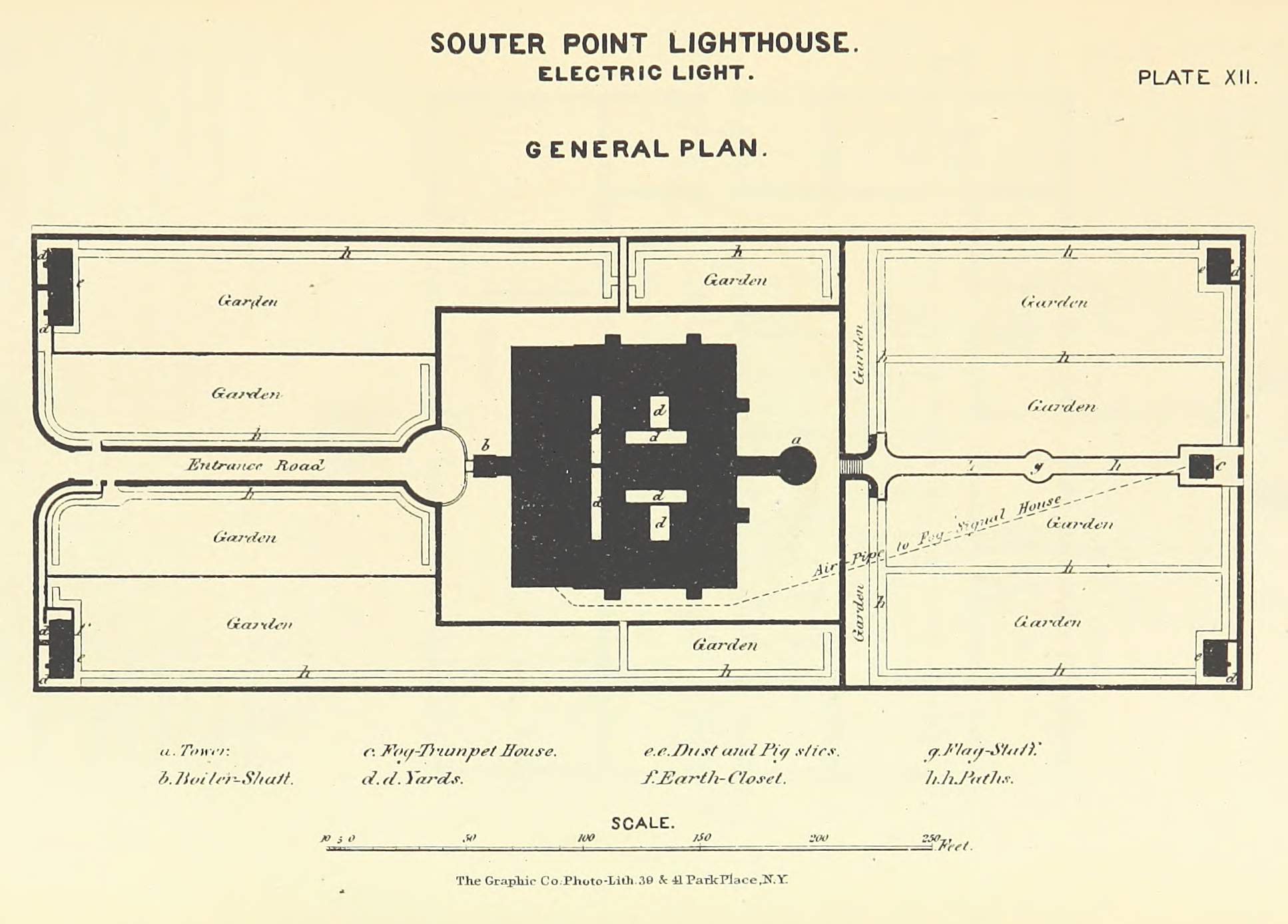
Site plan

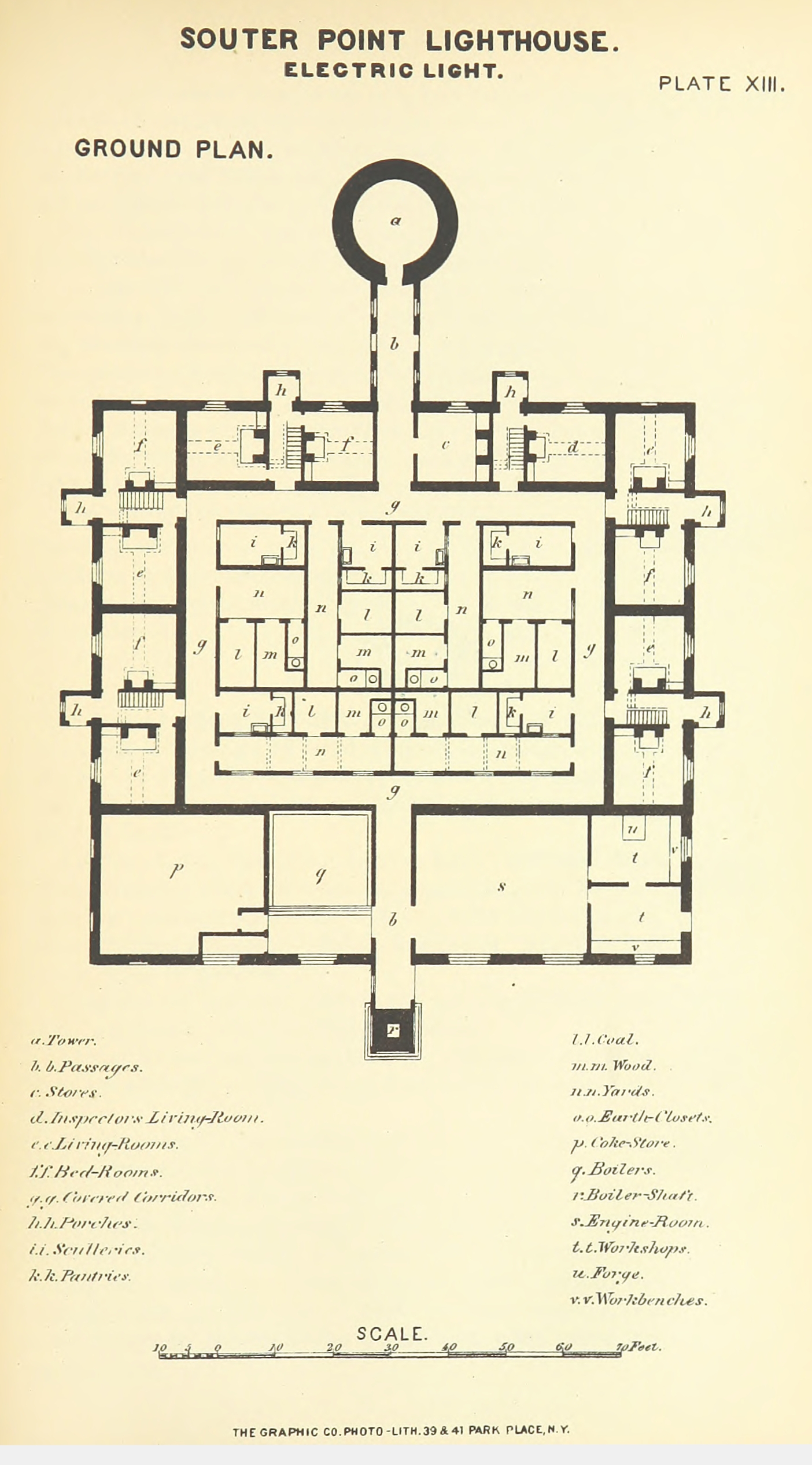
Ground plan

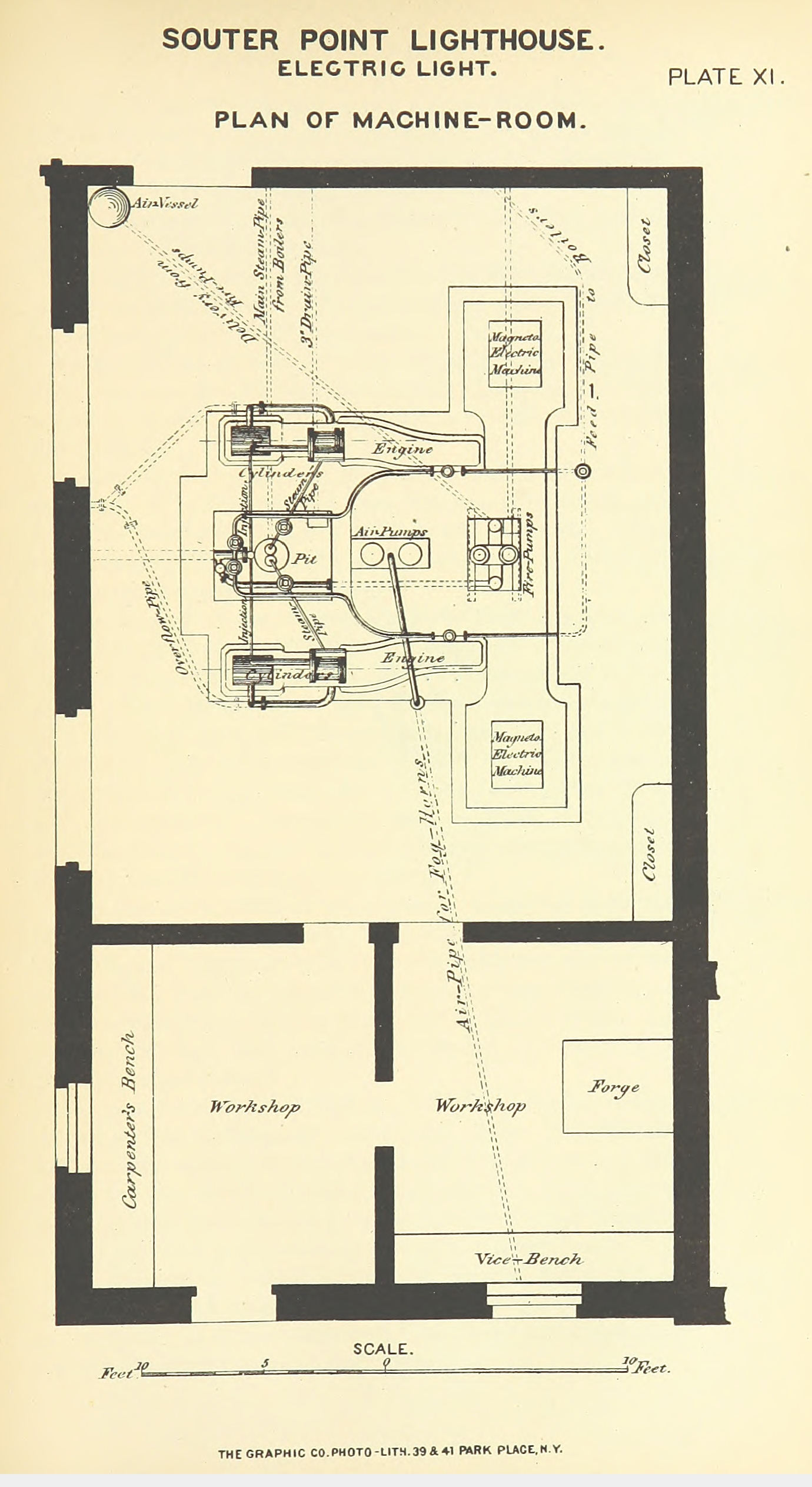
Machine room

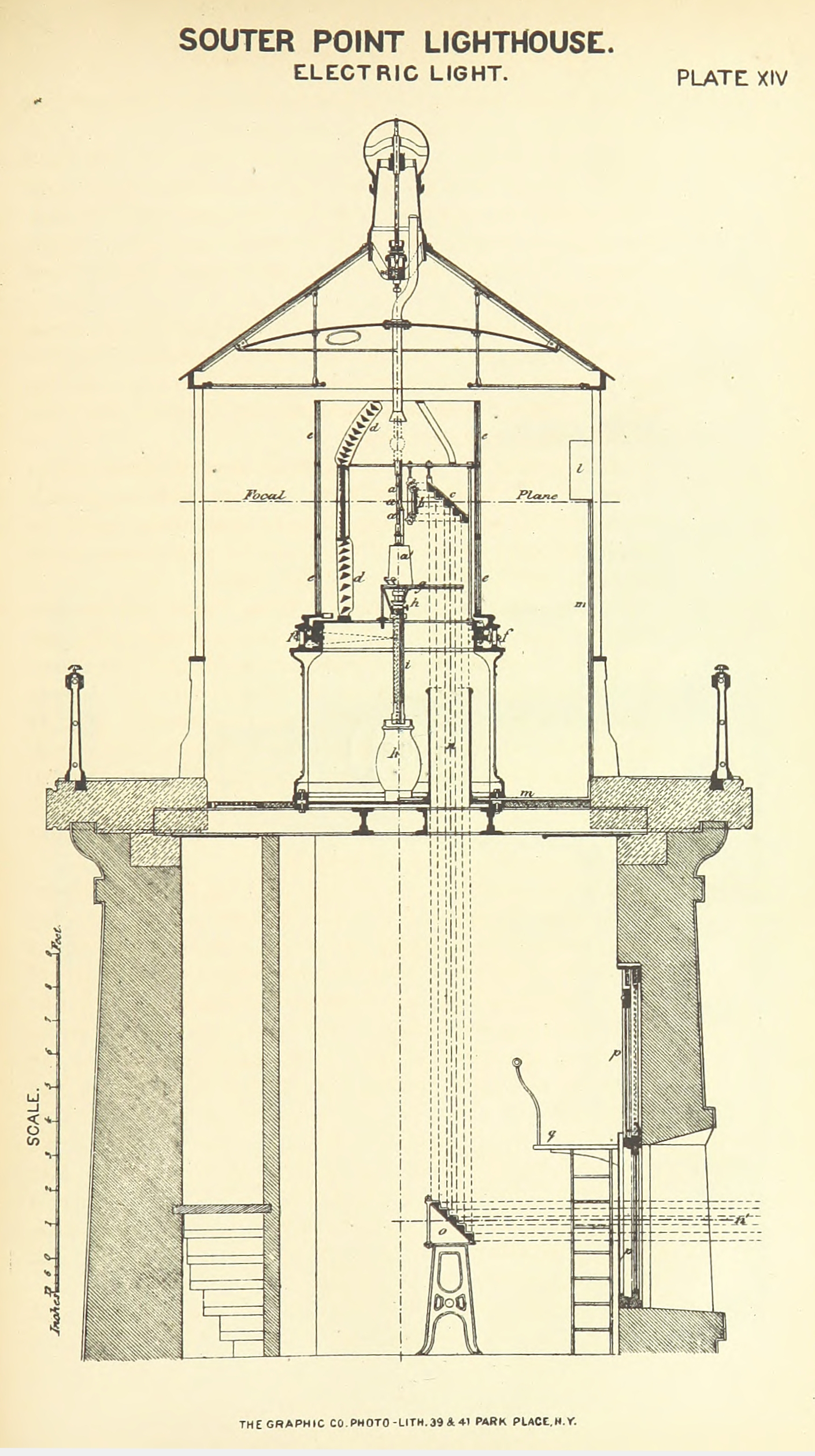
Light room

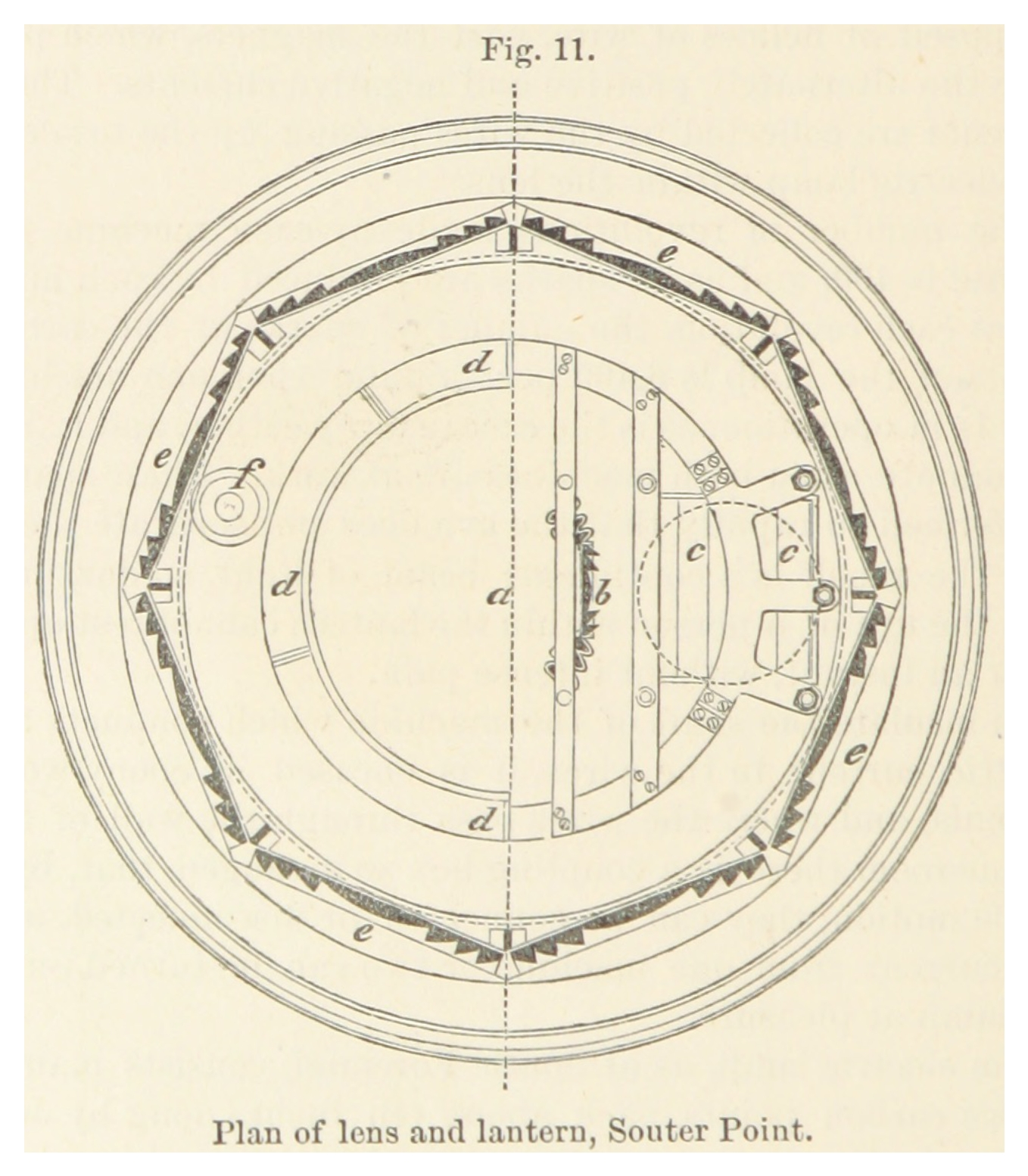
Lens and Lanterns

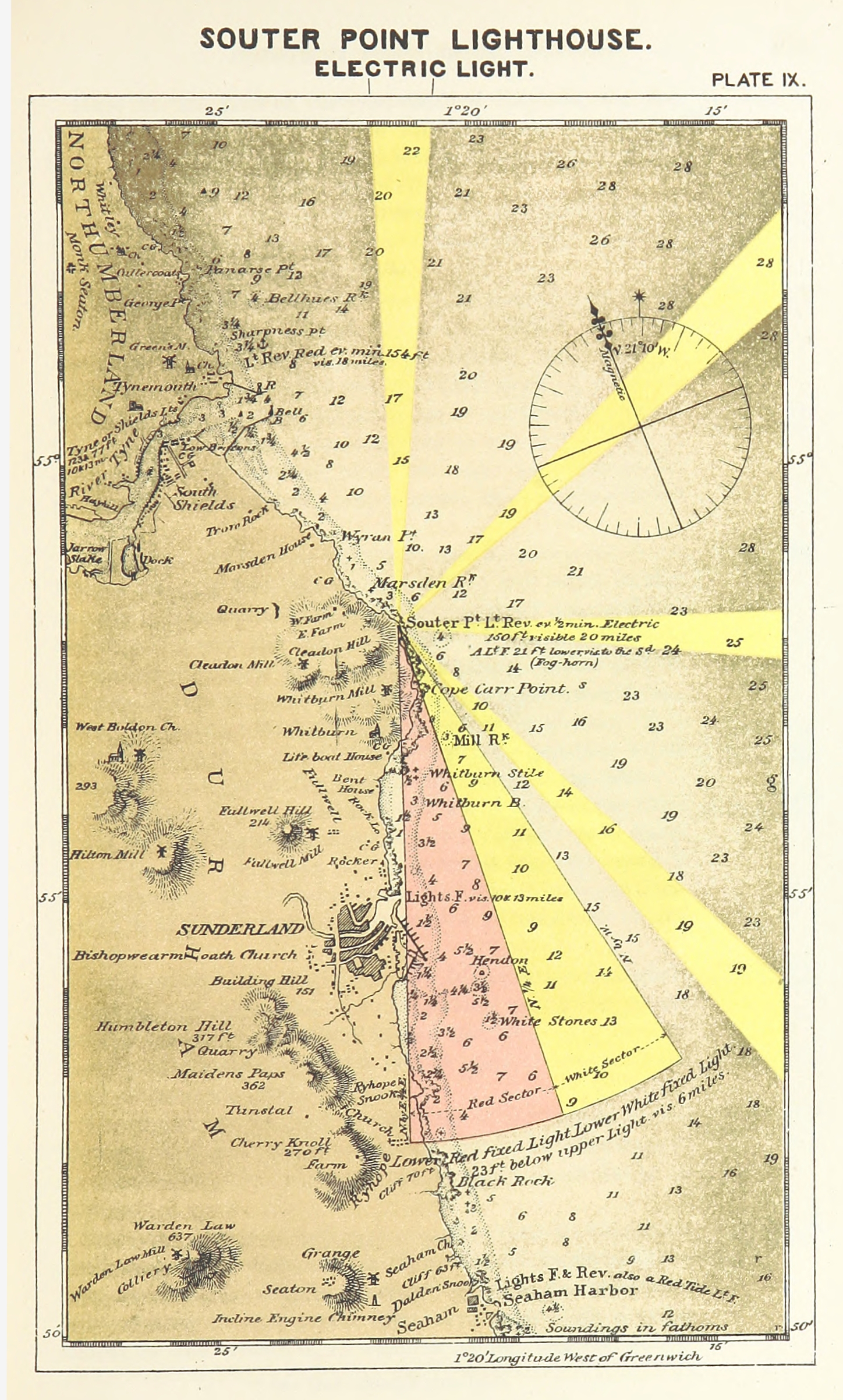
Chart of vicinity (1875)

=== 20th century ===
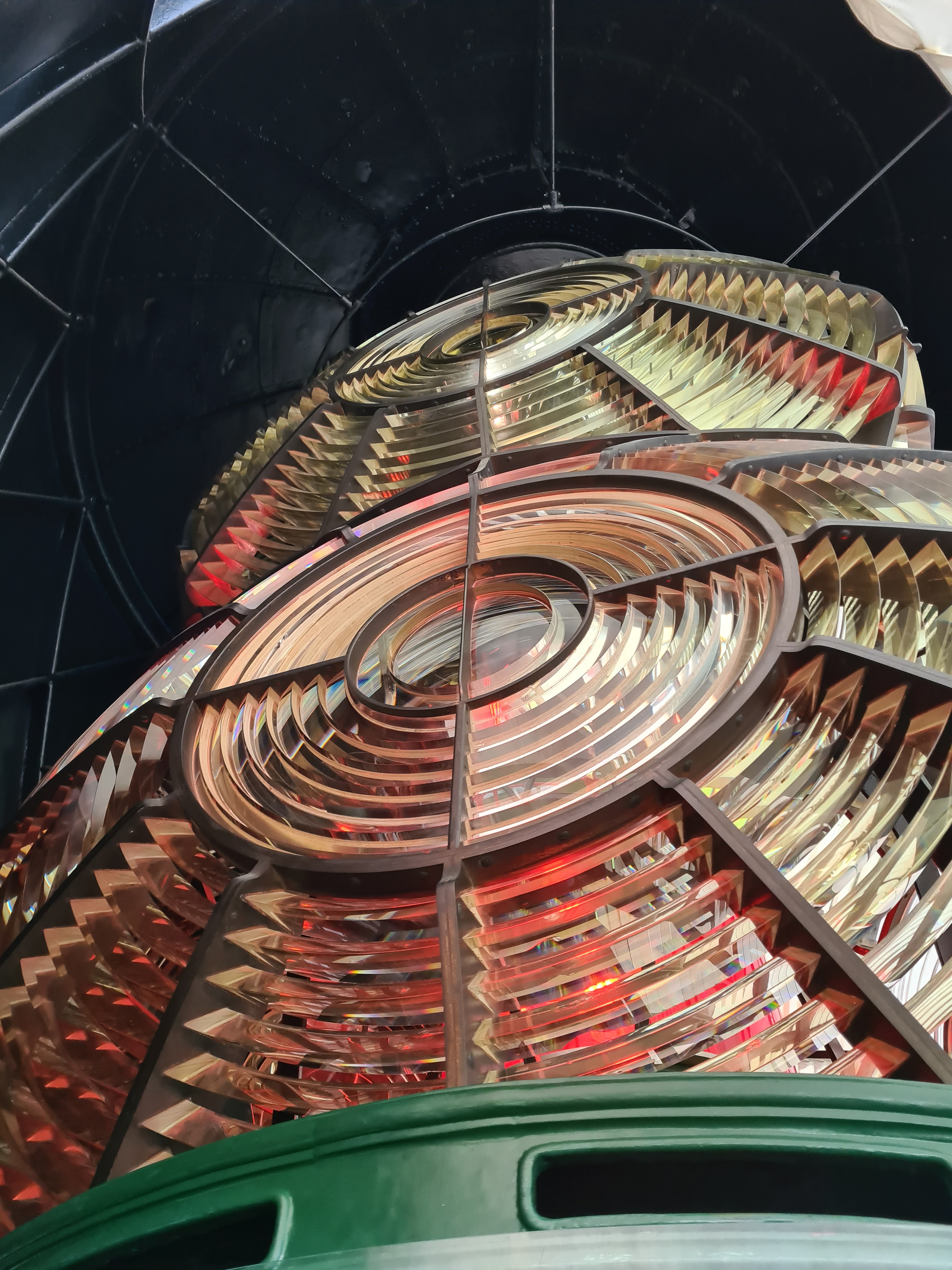
The current optical apparatus dates from 1914.

==== Conversion to oil ====
In 1914 the pioneering electric light at Souter was replaced with the latest type of incandescent oil lamps (i.e. paraffin vapour burners). At the same time Chance Brothers provided a new, much larger lens system: a bi-form first-order catadioptric revolving optic (a bi-form lens is double-height, containing two lamps, one above the other). At the same time a new lantern was provided, to accommodate the taller optic. Red shades were placed around the lamps, within the lenses, so that the light now flashed red, once every 5 seconds. The 1914 optic remains in situ in the tower; it weighs 4.5 tonnes and floats on 1.5 tonnes of mercury.

A separate lamp was used for the fixed red/white sector light, which continued to shine from its window lower down in the tower.

Having removed the two Holmes magneto-electric machines from the engine room, the Corporation of Trinity House presented one to the Institution of Electrical Engineers in 1915; it is now on display at the Science Museum, London.

The fog signal was improved in 1919 when a more powerful siren was installed, sounded through a pair of Rayleigh trumpets. (These replaced the twin Holmes trumpets formerly employed; the foghorn house was remodelled at the seaward corners to accommodate them). The siren gave a 4-second blast every minute. Hornsby oil engines were installed to drive the compressors for the new siren.

==== Reversion to electricity ====
In 1952 the lighthouse was again converted to run on electric power (this time using incandescent lamps, powered by mains electricity). The 4,500W bulbs used for the main light were the largest in the Trinity House service. Should the electricity supply fail, a diesel generator would be engaged (and in the event that it too were to fail, an additional emergency battery lamp would be engaged). The mechanism which turned the lenses continued to be driven by clockwork at this time, until 1983 when it was replaced by a pair of electric motors.

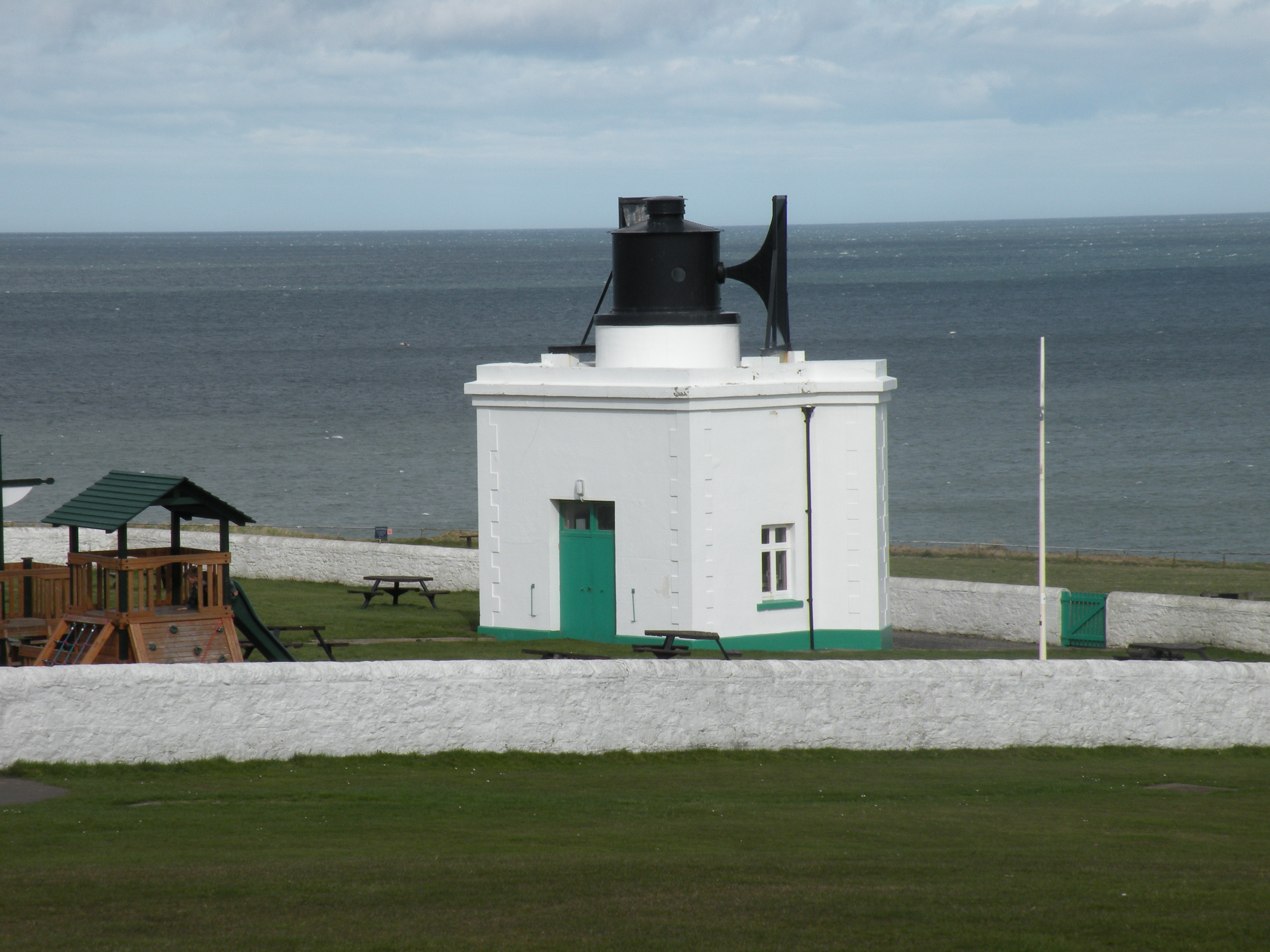
The foghorn building, looking out to sea.

The fog signal was upgraded in 1953: a Stone Chance diaphone signal was installed and a pair of exponential horns replaced the Rayleigh Trumpets on top of the foghorn building. At the same time the engine room was provided with two new Reavell compressor sets, one driven by an electric motor, the other by a diesel engine. The diaphone produced a five-second blast every 30 seconds in poor weather, and remained in use up until 1988, when the lighthouse was decommissioned.

=== Decommissioning ===
Souter Lighthouse was decommissioned by Trinity House in 1988, but continued to serve as a radio navigation beacon up until 1999 when it was finally closed.

== Present day ==
As Souter was never automated, it remains much in its original operational state except for updates during its lifespan to its lantern and electrical apparatus.

Today the decommissioned Souter lighthouse is owned by the National Trust and open to the public; the engine room, light tower and keeper's living quarters are all on view. There is also an outdoor play area, Trusty Club and indoor activities to accommodate young visitors. Two of the former lighthouse keepers' cottages are used as National Trust holiday cottages. The lamps, lenses and foghorn remain in working order and are still activated from time to time 'on special occasions'.

In 2011, South Tyneside Council and the National Trust commissioned artists Joshua Portway and Lise Autogena to produce an artistic work around the lighthouse. The result was Foghorn Requiem, a musical composition written by Orlando Gough for the lighthouse's foghorn, ships’ horns and brass bands. On 22 June 2013, it was performed at the lighthouse to an audience of thousands, with 65 musicians and over 50 ships taking part.

=== Gallery ===
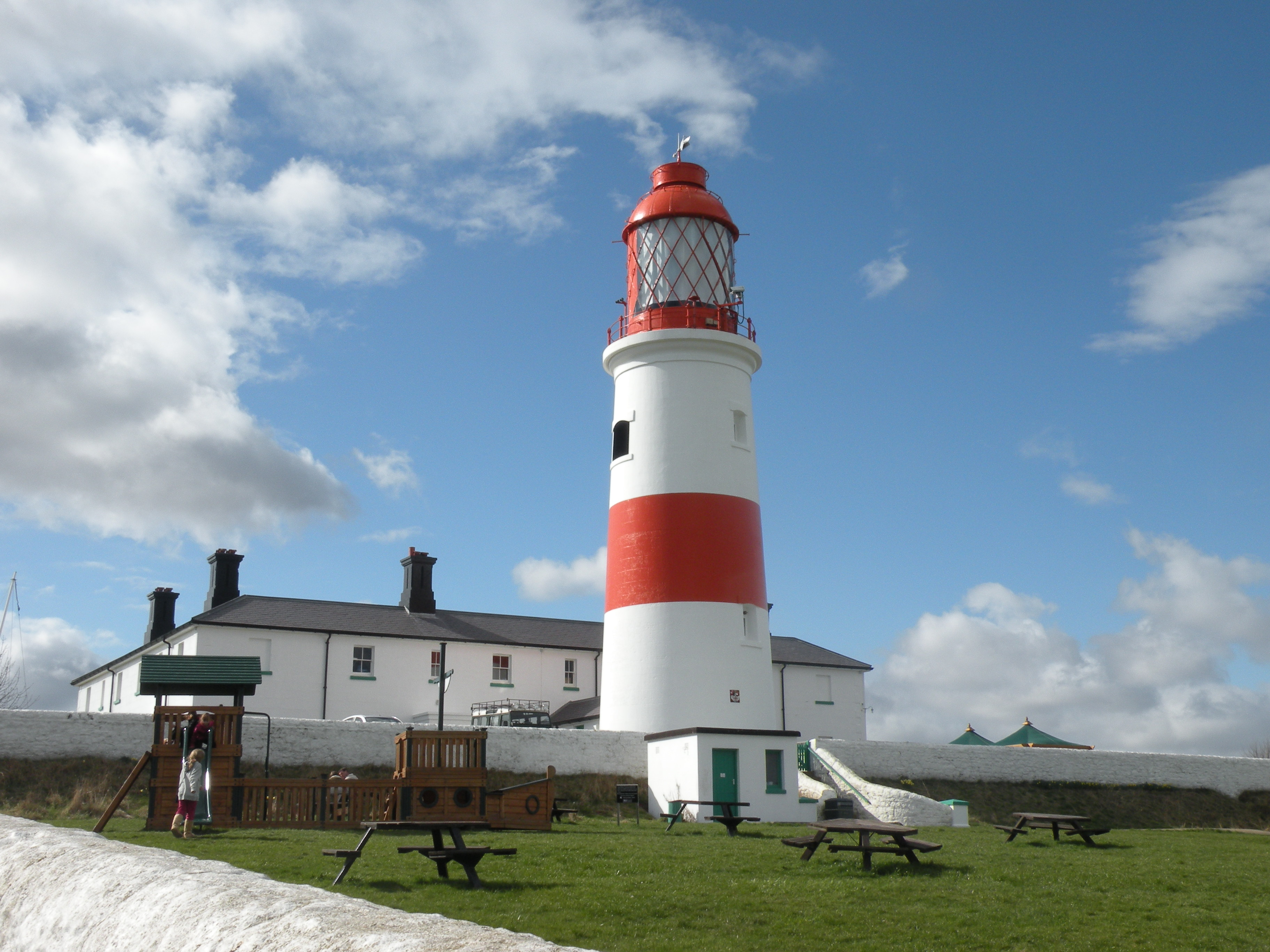
The lighthouse viewed from the south-east.

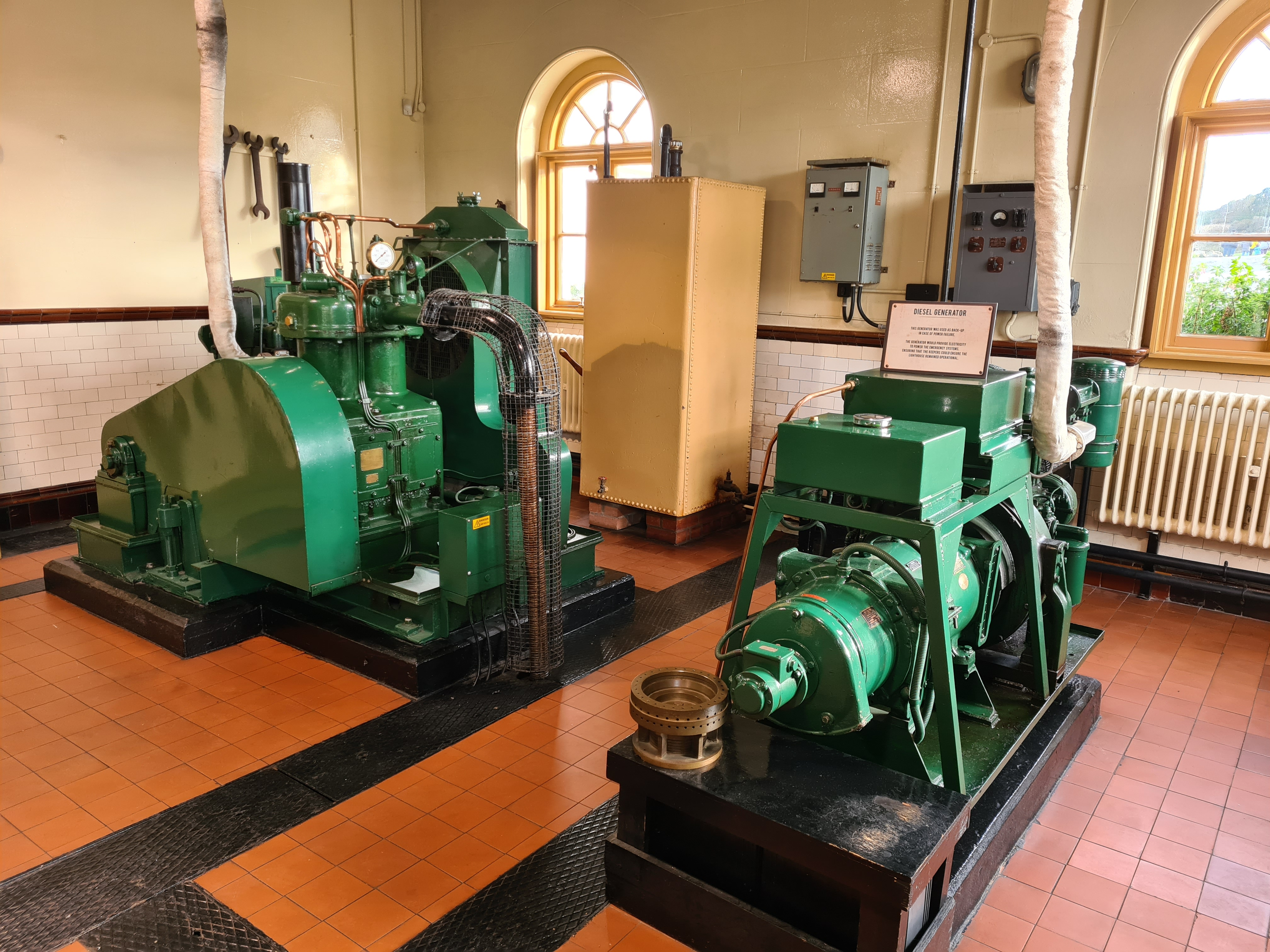
Diesel compressor and standby generator in the Engine Room.

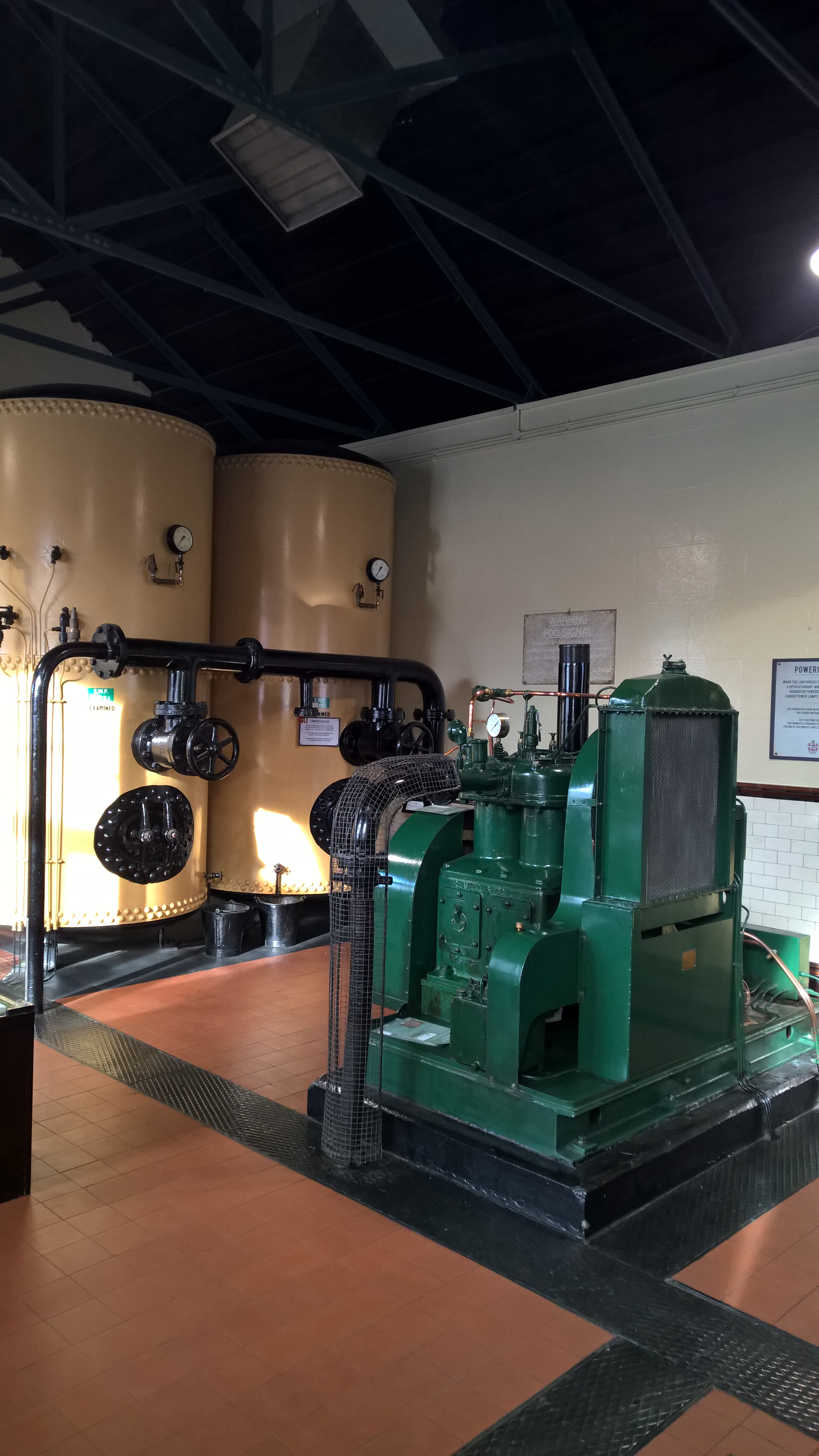
Electric compressor and air tanks for the foghorn in the Engine Room.

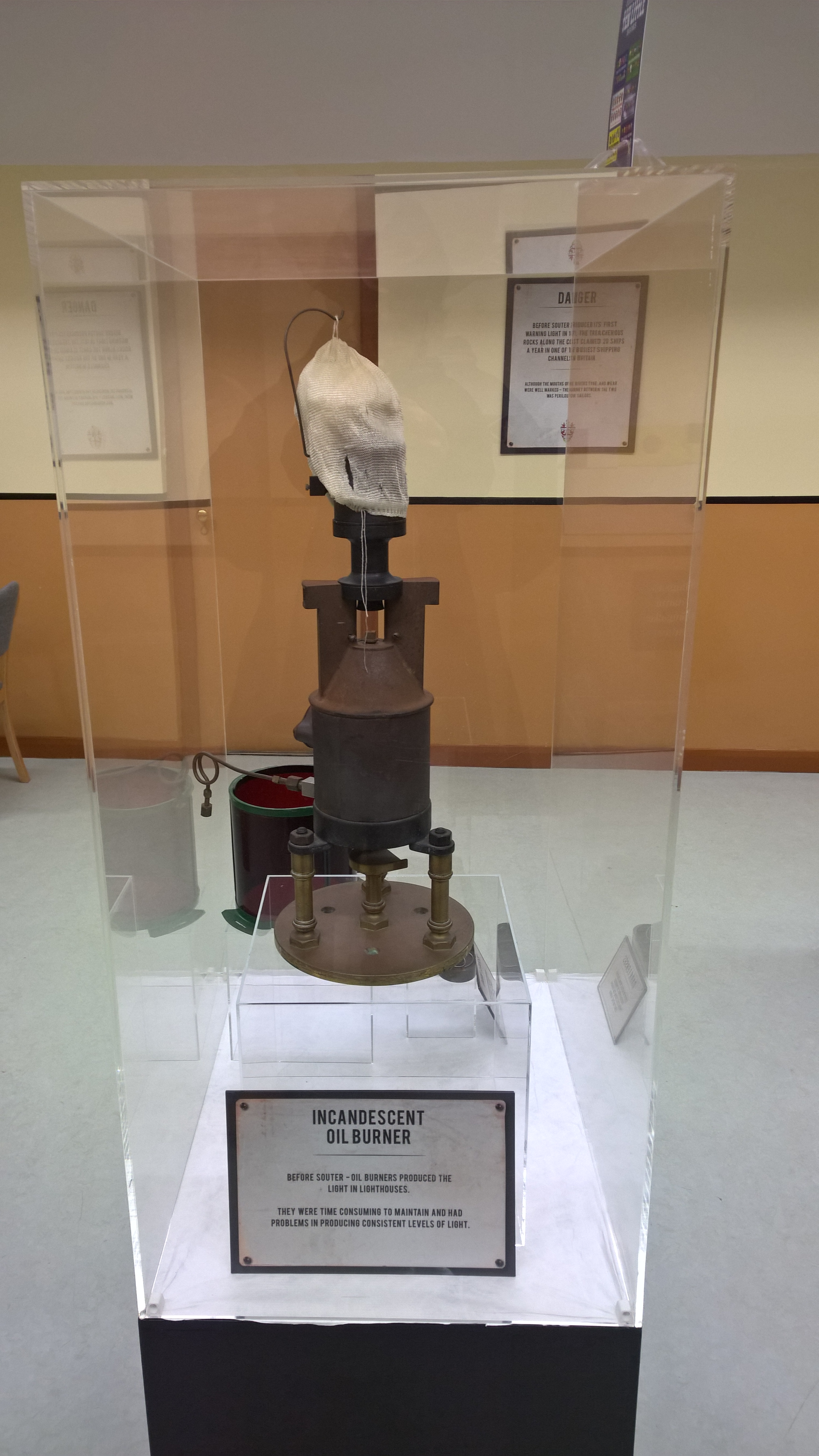
An incandescent oil burner: these replaced the arc lamps in 1914.

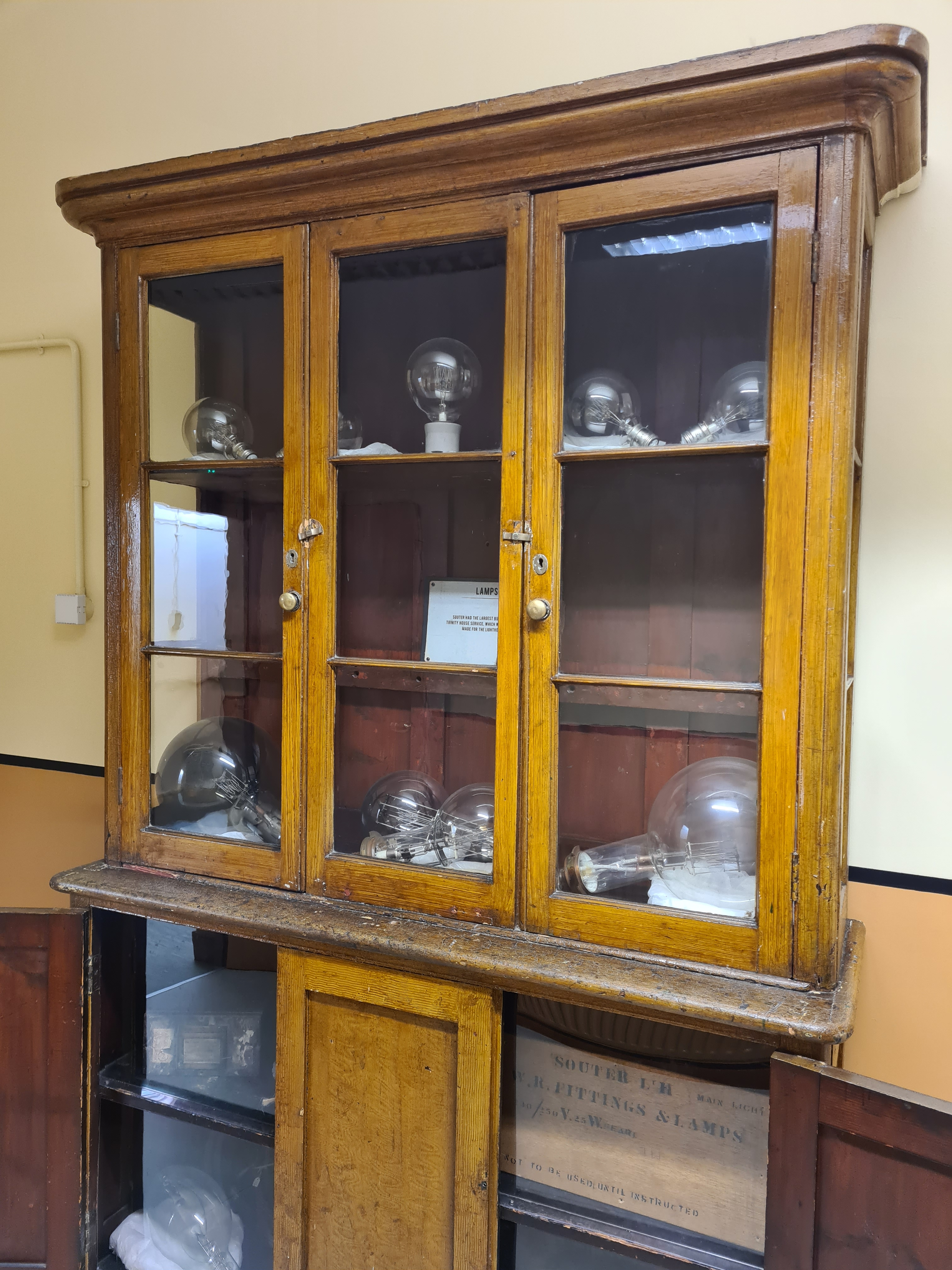
Some of the electric lamps used at Souter from 1952.

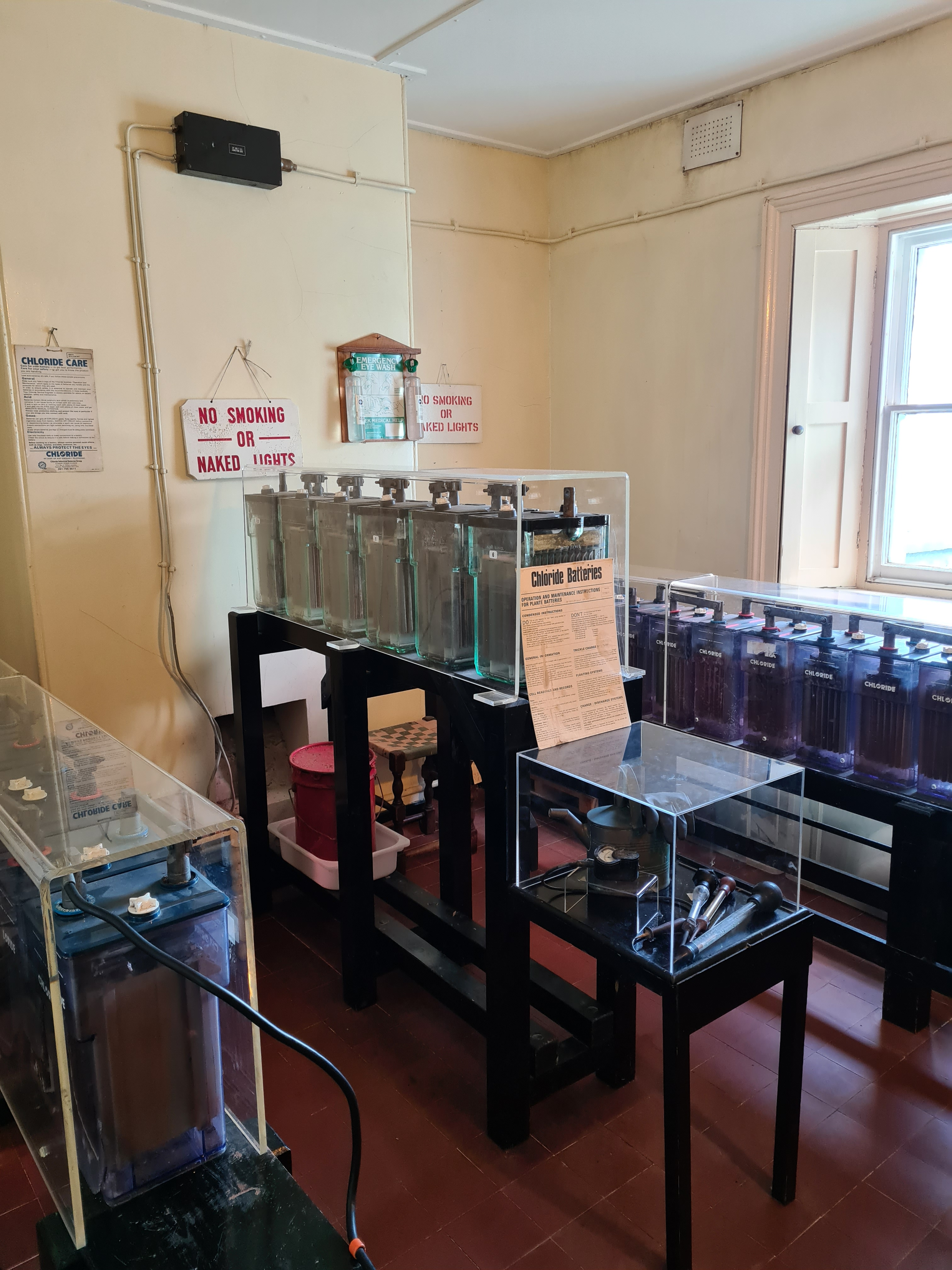
The emergency battery room.

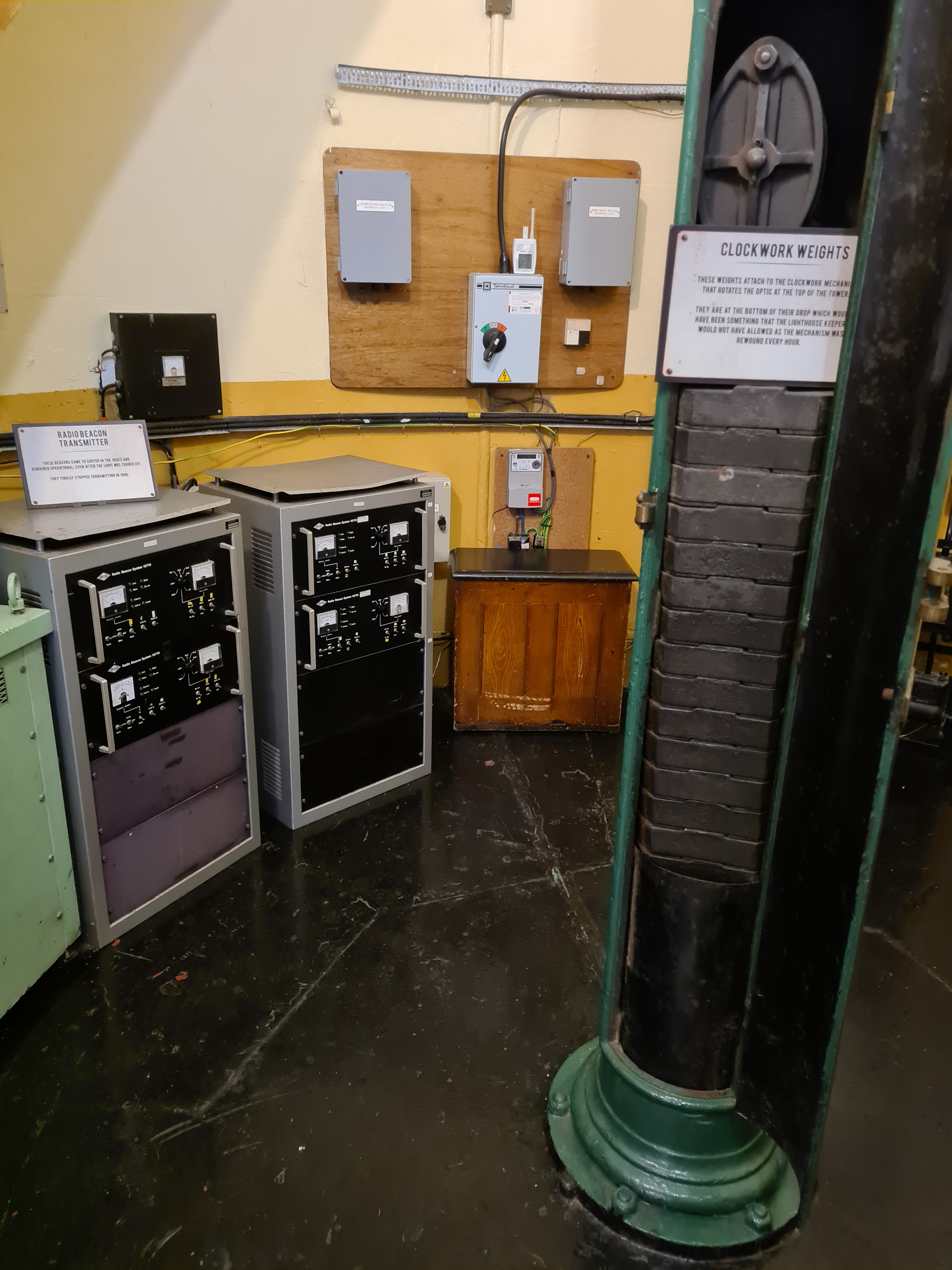
Radiobeacon equipment at the base of the tower.

== See also ==
- List of lighthouses in England
- Grade II* listed buildings in Tyne and Wear
