= Black Shoals =

Artificial ecosystem

Black Shoals is an artificial ecosystem linked to the real time dynamics of the stock market. It was first shown at the Tate Gallery in 2001, and nominated for an Alternative Turner Prize in 2002. A more sophisticated Black Shoals was exhibited at the Nikolaj gallery in Copenhagen in the spring of 2004.

Stars representing companies and creatures representing speculators are projected into a domed ceiling in a dark room, creating an artificial night sky which visualises the dynamics of the world stock markets.

Within this world, a creature's survival depends upon the strategies it uses to explore its world. The more a company is traded, the richer the food source for the creatures. Consequently, changes in trading patterns can be seen in the planetarium as explosions of life surrounding specific clusters of stars.

For this project, Cefn Hoile designed a population of articulated creatures which reproduce and evolve both their morphology and behaviour in real time in a planetarium style display. The project was conceived by Lise Autogena and Joshua Portway of Stain. Tom Riley was the lead software developer during the second showing of Black Shoals in 2004.

The name of the project is a pun on Black–Scholes, a widely used equation in financial derivatives pricing which earned two of its three inventors a Nobel Prize in Economics and provided the key assumptions underlying the 2008 financial crisis.

== See also ==
- Evolutionary art
- Artificial Life
- Natural Selection
- Joshua Portway
- Lise Autogena
