= Foghorn Requiem =

- Site-specific composition by Orlando Gough with Joshua Portway and Lise Autogena
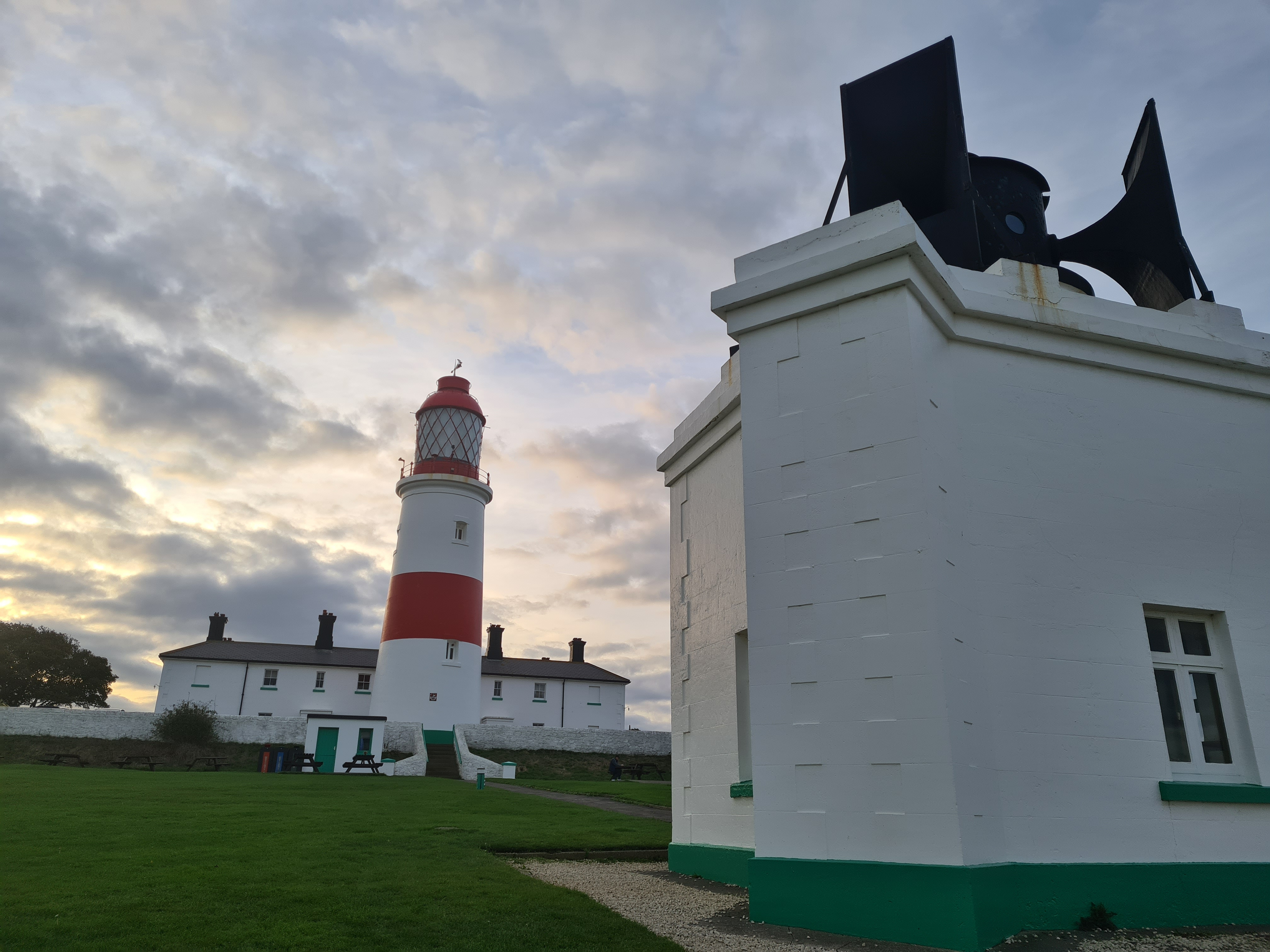
- Souter Lighthouse and Foghorn House, viewed from the seaward side
- Composed: 2013
- Duration: c. 30 min

Premiere
- Date: 22 June 2013
- Location: Souter Lighthouse
- Conductor: Stephen Malcolm

Foghorn Requiem was a site-specific composition for the foghorn at the Souter Lighthouse, together with ships’ horns and brass bands. It was written by Orlando Gough in collaboration with artists Joshua Portway and Lise Autogena. It was performed across an area spanning several miles around the lighthouse by 65 musicians and over 50 ships on 22 June 2013.

The South Tyneside Council and the National Trust commissioned the piece, and it was performed as part of the Festival of the North East. A few thousand people attended the performance, which received local, national and international press coverage. The organisers claimed it was "the first musical score created for foghorns".

== Background ==
Souter Lighthouse opened in 1871 and was the first lighthouse designed and built to be powered by electricity. The current foghorn, a Stone Chance diaphone signal, was installed in 1953 alongside a pair of exponential horns on top of the foghorn building. The horn produced a five-second blast every 30 seconds in poor weather, and remained in use up until 1988, when the lighthouse was decommissioned. After being decommissioned, the National Trust acquired the site and crowdfunded the renovation of the foghorn. The horn is notable for the distinctive "grunt" audible at the end of each blast.

In 2011, South Tyneside Council and the National Trust commissioned artists Joshua Portway and Lise Autogena to produce an artistic work around the lighthouse. After hearing the sound of the foghorn, Portway and Autogena were inspired to produce a musical composition which featured it prominently. They spent a year in the area, engaging with locals to help shape their vision and later enlisted Orlando Gough, a composer with experience working on projects exploring similar themes and scale, to write the score.

The piece was conceived as a commemoration of the disappearance of the foghorn from the British coastal landscape. At the time, only 24 foghorns remained in active use in England, and none still sounded in Scotland. Autogena is quoted as saying:

“When people were told that the foghorns were being turned off, they were quite emotional about it, and we realised that the foghorn has a huge meaning to a lot of people. It’s very connected to the landscape where we live. So we decided we wanted to create a Requiem for the Foghorn. It’s like a portrait of a region”.

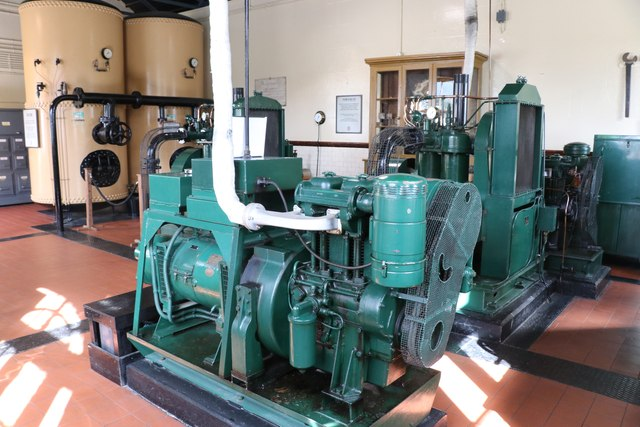
Souter Lighthouse engine room

Ahead of the performance, the artists travelled to Sweden and acquired a collection of tuned ships’ horns from Kockums. The horns were tuned to the notes the brass bands would be playing onshore.

A significant technical challenge was how to account for the sound lag between the offshore ships and the onshore brass band. The necessary technology was developed in association with Sheffield Hallam University and modelled in a research facility at Newcastle University. Each ship was fitted with a remotely controlled electronic device which included a GPS module. The device calculated the ship's position relative to the land, and, taking into account other factors including the air temperature and wind conditions, would activate the horns such that the sound would reach the brass bands in sync.

== Composition ==
The piece is divided into nine sections, each subtitled with regions from the shipping forecast:

1. Procession: Humber, Thames, Dover
2. Soundings: Wight, Portland, Plymouth
3. Warnings: Biscay, Trafalgar, Finisterre, Sole
4. Cyclone : Lundy, Fastnet, Irish Sea, Shannon
5. Ma Nighean Donn As Bòidche: Rockall, Malin, Hebrides, Bailey
6. Saltwater Lament: Fair Isle, Faroes, South Iceland
7. Aftermath: Viking, North Utsire, South Utsire
8. Wake: Forties, Cromarty, Forth, Tyne
9. Soundings: Dogger, Fisher, German Bight

It is scored for three brass bands (performed unamplified), ships’ horns and the Souter Lightouse foghorn.

== Participants ==
In the months leading up to the performance, calls were issued for vessels to join the event. Around fifty-five vessels of varying sizes made up the final flotilla. The largest of these was the cruiseferry MS Princess Seaways operated by DFDS. Other vessels included the RV Princess Royal operated by the Newcastle University School of Marine Science & Technology, and three ships listed on the National Register of Historic Ships.

To ensure the safety of the event, vessels from the RNLI, Northumbria Police Marine Unit and other local operators were present.

Onshore, Stephen Malcolm conducted the amassed brass of Felling Band, NASUWT Riverside Band and Westoe Band, all from the North-East of England.

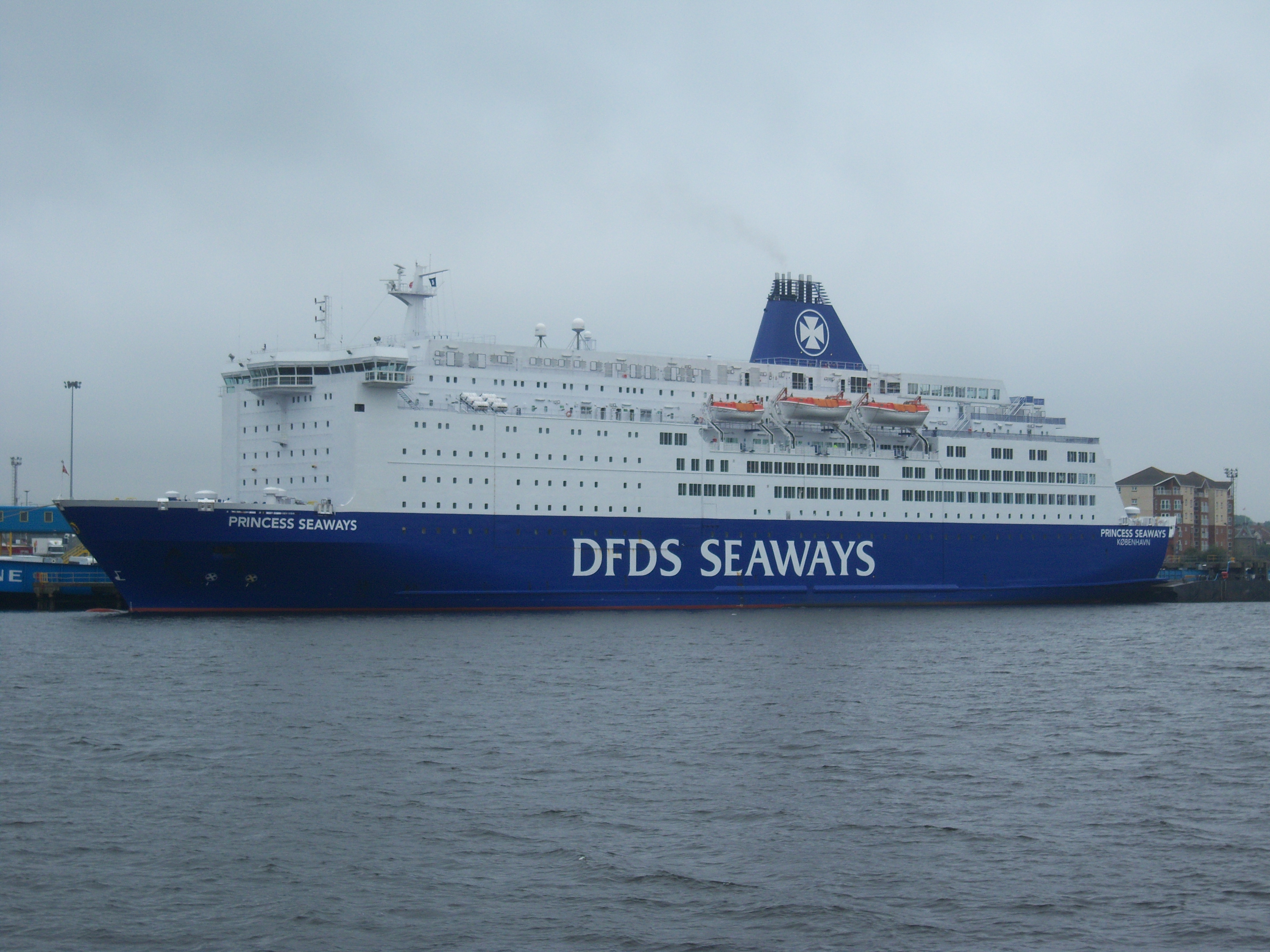
MS Princess Seaways

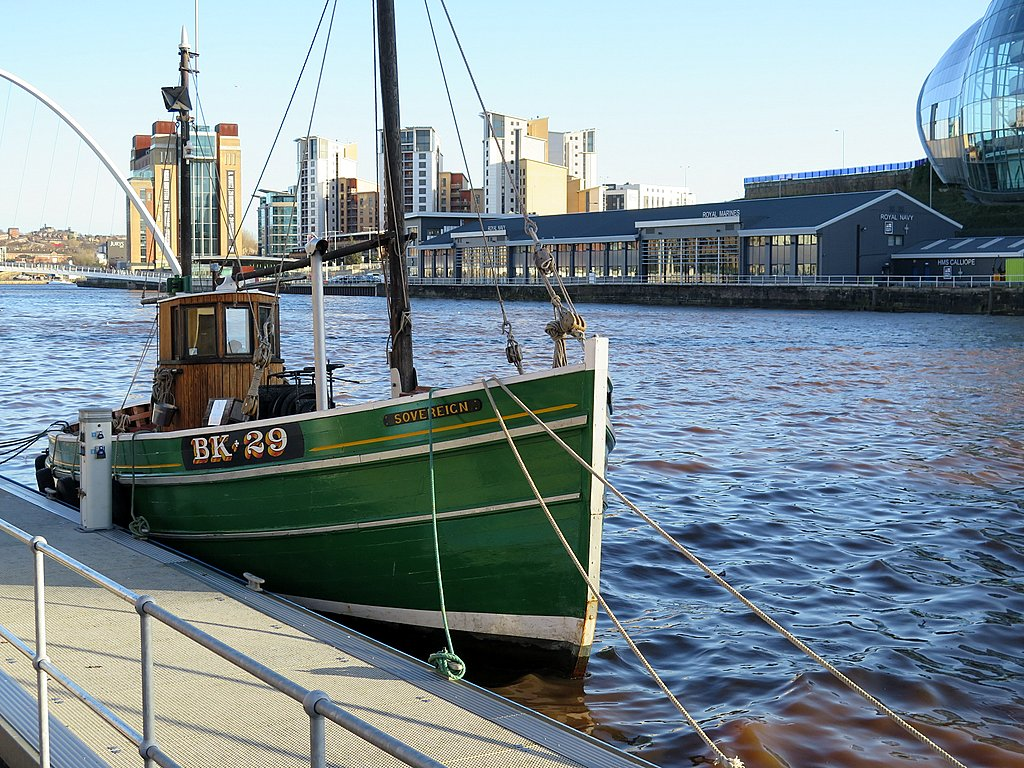
Sovereign, an historic fishing vessel

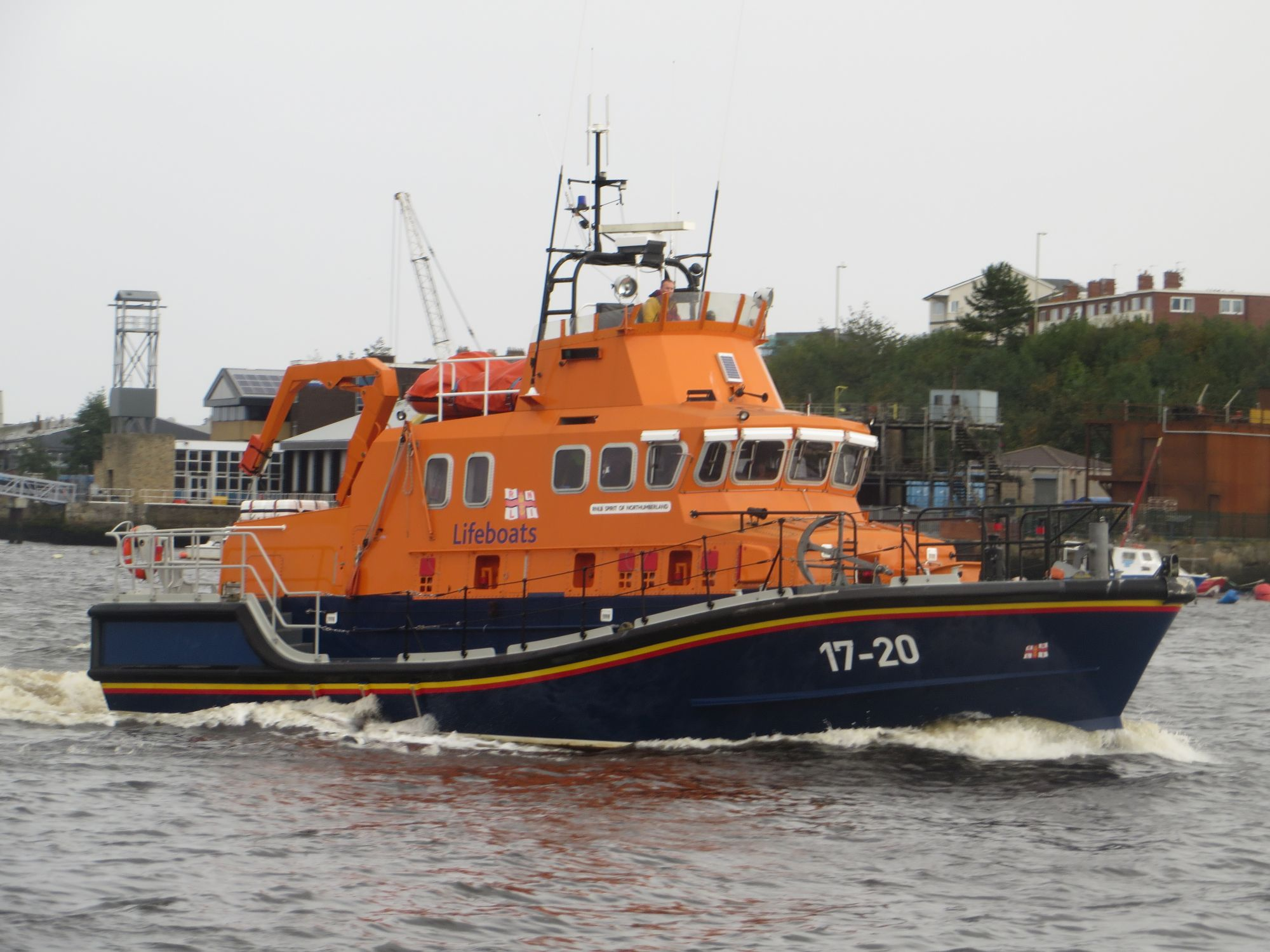
RNLB The Spirit of Northumberland

== Performance ==
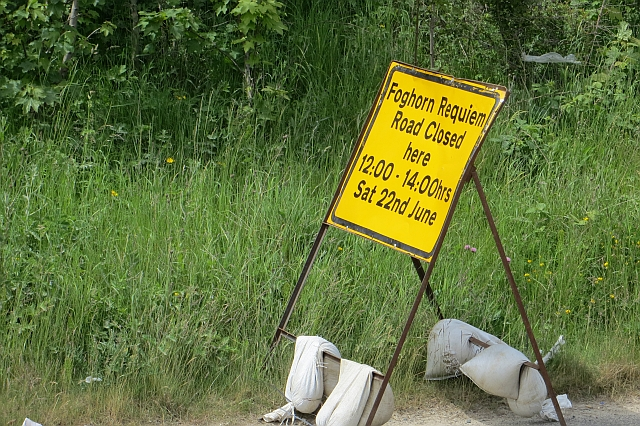
Road closure in the nearby area

Participating ships converged upon Lizard Point from moorings between Amble and Whitby. Three thousand people had bought tickets to be aboard the MV Princess Seaways during the performance. Meanwhile, hundreds of people gathered on the cliffs surrounding Souter Lighthouse. In the morning, Portway and Autogena delivered the electronic devices controlling the ships' horns to the participating vessels and subsequently almost missed the performance due to road closures.

The performance opened with a procession on land and offshore, the amassed brass bands proceeding to the performance area between the foghorn and the sea, while the participating ships manoeuvred into their positions. Following this, a solo cornet played a prelude from atop the Souter Lighthouse. The brass band then took over with a series of tone clusters to which the ships' horns responded in conversation. The foghorn interrupted the back-and-forth, a powerful blast drowning out the band and the ships' horns.

Towards the end of the piece, the brass players processed once again, lining up along the cliff. With their backs to the onshore audience, they played out across the sea.

The piece concluded with a final blast of the foghorn, the air allowed to drain from its reservoir, the sound faltering until it faded to nothing.

== Reception ==
National and international media outlets reported on the performance and the lead-up to it. A report of the event was featured in the Danish newspaper Kristeligt Dagblad.

Journalist Jennifer Lucy Allan, author of The Foghorn’s Lament, wrote that the piece marked the death of the foghorn as well as the industry it was associated with. She points out the particular significance of the Requiem to the region, writing that the foghorn "was the trigger and symbol of loss - of work, of industry, of life".

Composer and sound historian, Sarah Angliss, wrote that it was an "astounding performance, with many standout moments". She also praised the communal and site-specific nature of the piece, commenting that “as participative art it was exemplary”.

Multiple people in attendance remarked upon the impact of the final blast of the foghorn. Interviewed a few years after the performance, Autogena stated that the "recordings don't do it justice" and that the decaying sound of the foghorn had a "strangely human, or animalistic sound". Sarah Angliss also described it as animalistic, "like the last cry of a wounded beast", while sound designer Robin the Fog likened it to a "huge monster tearing out its lungs".

After the foghorn fell silent, some audience members were visibly emotional. The performance required the cooperation of the Port of Tyne harbourmaster, Mike Nicholson, who was initially not interested in the project. He did, however, acquiesce and ultimately attended the performance, which he conceded was "moving".

According to Autogena, poems, paintings and a children's story have been created in response to the piece.

The performance has a Guinness World Record entry for the "most ship horns in a piece of music". It is also noted as "the first time a foghorn has played as an integral part of a brass band, and the first time a brass band has played with tuned ships horns."
