= Joshua Portway =

British artist and game designer (born 1967)

Joshua Portway (born 1967) is an artist and game designer. He is a frequent collaborator with Lise Autogena, for example on their Black Shoals stock market. He is also the author of the Noodle series of interactive music pieces, which was originally created as a part of larger world music project at Peter Gabriel's Real World Multimedia studio. Although the main project didn't see the light of day, Noodle was released as an interactive track on a number of Real World CDs, and later evolved into Noodle Heaven.

By 1984, he had written and published the game "Sim" for the BBC Micro and Acorn Electron, which reached number 2 in the charts in 1985.

In 2002 he was nominated (along with Lise Autogena) for the Alternative Turner Prize. He is the son of the artist Douglas Portway, and brother of actor and musician Saskia Portway.
