= Lise Autogena =

Danish artist living in the UK (born 1964)

- Born: 1964 (age 61–62)
- Occupation: artist
- Known for: Sound Mirrors, Black Shoals
- Awards: NESTA fellowship

Lise Autogena (born 1964) is a Danish artist living in the United Kingdom. At the age of 17, she left home to live in Denmark's experimental community Christiania, an experience which she has said was very important in her development.

Autogena is best known for the Sound Mirrors project . Inspired by the derelict acoustic mirrors at the former RAF Denge in England, it aims to create two new sound mirrors on the coast of England and France which will enable people on either side of the English Channel to speak to each other. Her work tends to feature very lengthy and complex development, involving forming diverse communities of artists, business people, scientists, and children, who come together to work on each project. She says:

“From the outset, I am often not sure whether it will be possible to realise my rather Utopian projects. I nevertheless commit years of research and development. Risk is an important part of my work, and the long term potential of my projects is important to me.”

In 2001, Black Shoals, in collaboration with Joshua Portway, was shown at the Tate Gallery, London. In 2004 she was recipient to a prestigious three-year National Endowment of Science, Technology and the Arts (NESTA) fellowship, aiding development of her work.

In 2013, again in collaboration with Joshua Portway, Autogena created Foghorn Requiem, a performance involving a Tyneside foghorn, 55 ships at sea and brass bands on land. Scored by Orlando Gough, it was said to be the first musical score created for foghorns. Performed to an audience of 8000, the piece was recognized by Guinness World Records for having the "most ship horns in a piece of music".
