= List of lighthouses in England =

Coastal lighthouses in Cornwall; B = Bishop Rock	Coastal lighthouses in England (except Cornwall) = operational lighthouse = deactivated lighthouse = demolished lighthouse (Lights deactivated or demolished before 1970 are omitted.)

This is a list of lighthouses in England. It includes lighthouses which are no longer in use as a light but are still standing. It also includes some of the harbour and pier-head lights around the country.

Details of several lighthouses and lightvessels in current use in England, together with Wales, the Channel Islands and Gibraltar can be found on the website of Trinity House. Locations of major lighthouses are shown on the adjacent map.

== Active lighthouses ==
Name	Image	Location & coordinates	County	Year built	Tower height	Focal height	Range	Operator	NGA number
Anvil Point Lighthouse		Anvil Point	Dorset	1881	12 m (39 ft)	45 m (148 ft)	9 nmi (17 km; 10 mi)	Trinity House	114-0544
Bamburgh Lighthouse		Bamburgh	Northumberland	1910	9 m (30 ft)	12 m (39 ft)	14 nmi (26 km; 16 mi) (white), 11 nmi (20 km; 13 mi) (red green)	Trinity House	114-2252
Beachy Head Lighthouse		Beachy Head	Sussex	1902	33 m (108 ft)	31 m (102 ft)	8 nmi (15 km; 9.2 mi)	Trinity House	114-1140
Berkeley Pill Front light		Severn Estuary	Gloucestershire	1937	8 m (26 ft)	5 m (16 ft)		Gloucester Harbour Trustees	
Berkeley Pill Rear light		Severn Estuary	Gloucestershire	1937	12 m (39 ft)	11 m (36 ft)		Gloucester Harbour Trustees	
Berry Head Lighthouse		Berry Head	Devon	1906	5 m (16 ft)	58 m (190 ft)	19 nmi (35 km; 22 mi)	Trinity House	114-0344
Berwick Lighthouse		Berwick-upon-Tweed	Northumberland	1826	13 m (43 ft)	15 m (49 ft)	6 nmi (11 km; 6.9 mi)	Port of Berwick	114-2264
Bishop Rock Lighthouse		Bishop Rock	Cornwall	1858	49 m (161 ft)	44 m (144 ft)	20 nmi (37 km; 23 mi)	Trinity House	114-4
Bull Point Lighthouse		Mortehoe	Devon	1879	11 m (36 ft)	54 m (177 ft)	20 nmi (37 km; 23 mi)	Trinity House	114-6228
Burnham-on-Sea Low Lighthouse		Burnham-on-Sea	Somerset	1832 (Note: Inactive between 1969–1993.)	9 m (30 ft)			Somerset Council (Note: Previously operated by Trinity House.)	114-6172
Chapel Rock Lighthouse		Gloucestershire	Gloucestershire	1907	8 m (26 ft)	6 m (20 ft)	8 nmi (15 km; 9.2 mi)	Gloucester Harbour Trustees	114-5994
Coquet Lighthouse		Hauxley	Northumberland	1841	22 m (72 ft)	25 m (82 ft)	19 nmi (35 km; 22 mi) (white), 15 nmi (28 km; 17 mi) (red)	Trinity House	114-2228
Cromer Lighthouse		Cromer	Norfolk	1833	18 m (59 ft)	84 m (276 ft)	21 nmi (39 km; 24 mi)	Trinity House	114-1676
Crow Point Lighthouse		Braunton Burrows	Devon	1954	5 m (16 ft)	7.6 m (25 ft)	6 nmi (11 km; 6.9 mi) (white), 5 nmi (9.3 km; 5.8 mi) (red)	Trinity House	114-6240
Dungeness Lighthouse		Dungeness	Kent	1961	43 m (141 ft)	40 m (130 ft)	21 nmi (39 km; 24 mi)	Trinity House	114-1220
Eddystone Lighthouse		Eddystone Rocks	Cornwall	1882	49 m (161 ft)	41 m (135 ft), 28 m (92 ft)	17 nmi (31 km; 20 mi) (white), 8 nmi (15 km; 9.2 mi) (red)	Trinity House	114-132
Farne Lighthouse		Farne Islands	Northumberland	1811	13 m (43 ft)	27 m (89 ft)	10 nmi (19 km; 12 mi) (white), 7 nmi (13 km; 8.1 mi) (red)	Trinity House	114-2256
Flamborough Head Lighthouse		Flamborough	Yorkshire	1806	26.5 m (87 ft)	65 m (213 ft)	24 nmi (44 km; 28 mi)	Trinity House, East Riding of Yorkshire Council	114-1964
Pharos Lighthouse		Fleetwood	Lancashire	1840	27 m (89 ft)	28 m (92 ft)	9 nmi (17 km; 10 mi)	Port of Fleetwood	114-5156
Beach Lighthouse		Fleetwood	Lancashire	1840	13 m (43 ft)	14 m (46 ft)	9 nmi (17 km; 10 mi)	Port of Fleetwood	114-5152
Folkestone Lighthouse		Folkestone	Kent	1860	13 m (43 ft)	14 m (46 ft)	22 nmi (41 km; 25 mi)	Folkestone Harbour	114-1228
Godrevy Lighthouse		St Ives	Cornwall	1 Mar 1859	26 m (85 ft)	28 m (92 ft)	8 nmi (15 km; 9.2 mi)	Trinity House	114-6284
Gorleston South Pier Lighthouse		Gorleston-on-Sea	Norfolk	1955	8 m (26 ft)	11 m (36 ft)	11 nmi (20 km; 13 mi)	Great Yarmouth Port Authority	114-1624
Guile Point East Lighthouse		Lindisfarne	Northumberland	1859	29 ft (8.8 m)	9 m (30 ft)	4 nmi (7.4 km; 4.6 mi)	Trinity House (from Nov 1995), Newcastle-upon-Tyne Trinity House (until Nov 1995) (Note: Previously operated by Newcastle-upon-Tyne Trinity House.)	114-2262
Happisburgh Lighthouse		Happisburgh	Norfolk	1791	26 m (85 ft)	41 m (135 ft)	14 nmi (26 km; 16 mi)	Trinity House (until 1990), Happisburgh Lighthouse Trust (from 1990)	114-1668
Hartland Point Lighthouse		Hartland Point	Devon	1874	18 m (59 ft)	37 m (121 ft)	8 nmi (15 km; 9.2 mi)	Trinity House (Note: Still listed by Trinity House, but light now mounted separately.)	114-6252
Heugh Lighthouse		Hartlepool	County Durham	1927	16 m (52 ft)	19 m (62 ft)	19 nmi (35 km; 22 mi)	PD Ports	114-2056
Herd Groyne Light		South Shields	Tyne and Wear	1882	15 m (49 ft)	13 m (43 ft)	19 nmi (35 km; 22 mi) (white), 11 nmi (20 km; 13 mi) (green red)	Port of Tyne	114-2112
Heugh Hill Lighthouse		Lindisfarne	Northumberland	1826	8 m (26 ft)	24 m (79 ft)	5 nmi (9.3 km; 5.8 mi)	Trinity House	114-2263
Hilbre Island Lighthouse		Hilbre Island	Merseyside	1927	3 m (9.8 ft)	14 m (46 ft)	5 nmi (9.3 km; 5.8 mi)	Trinity House (Note: Previously operated by Mersey Docks and Harbour Company.)	114-5380
Hurst Point Lighthouse		Hurst Castle	Hampshire	1867	26 m (85 ft)	23 m (75 ft), 19 m (62 ft)	13 nmi (24 km)	Trinity House	114-0596
Ilfracombe Lighthouse		Ilfracombe	Devon	1819	11 m (36 ft)	39 m (128 ft)	6 nmi (11 km; 6.9 mi)	Ilfracombe Harbour Board	114-6220
Instow Front Lighthouse		Instow	Devon	1820	18 m (59 ft)	22 m (72 ft)	15 nmi (28 km; 17 mi)	Trinity House	
Instow Rear Lighthouse		Instow	Devon	1820	8.5 m (28 ft)	38 m (125 ft)	15 nmi (28 km; 17 mi)	Trinity House	114-6236
Killingholme High Lighthouse		South Killingholme	Lincolnshire	1876	24 m (79 ft)	22 m (72 ft)	3 nmi (5.6 km; 3.5 mi)	Port of Immingham (Note: Previously operated by Hull Trinity House.)	114-1916
Killingholme South Low Lighthouse		South Killingholme	Lincolnshire	1836	14 m (46 ft)	10 m (33 ft)	14 nmi (26 km; 16 mi)	Port of Immingham	114-1912
Lizard Lighthouse		Lizard Point	Cornwall	1751	19 m (62 ft)	70 m (230 ft)	26 nmi (48 km; 30 mi)	Trinity House	114-0064
Longships Lighthouse		Longships	Cornwall	1875	35 m (115 ft)	35 m (115 ft)	15 nmi (28 km; 17 mi) (white), 11 nmi (20 km; 13 mi) (red)	Trinity House	114-0024
Longstone Lighthouse		Farne Islands	Northumberland	1826	26 m (85 ft)	23 m (75 ft)	24 nmi (44 km; 28 mi), 18 nmi (33 km; 21 mi)	Trinity House	114-2260
Lowestoft Lighthouse		Lowestoft	Suffolk	1874	16 m (52 ft)	37 m (121 ft)	23 nmi (43 km; 26 mi)	Trinity House	114-1620
Lundy North Lighthouse		Torridge, Lundy	Devon	1897	17 m (56 ft)	48 m (157 ft)	17 nmi (31 km; 20 mi)	Trinity House	114-6244
Lundy South Lighthouse		Torridge, Lundy	Devon	1897	16 m (52 ft)	53 m (174 ft)	15 nmi (28 km; 17 mi)	Trinity House	114-6248
Lyde Rock lighthouse		Severn Estuary	Gloucestershire	2008	10 m (33 ft)	12 m (39 ft)	5 nmi (9.3 km; 5.8 mi)	Gloucester Harbour Trustees	
Lynmouth Foreland Lighthouse		Foreland Point	Devon	1900	15 m (49 ft)	67 m (220 ft)	18 nmi (33 km; 21 mi)	Trinity House	114-6208
Maryport New Lighthouse		Maryport	Cumbria	1996	4.7 m (15 ft), 6 m (20 ft)	10 m (33 ft)	6 nmi (11 km; 6.9 mi)	Trinity House (until 2010), Maryport Harbour Authority (from 2010)	114-4860
Nab Tower		Nab Rock	-	1918	27 m (89 ft)	17 m (56 ft)	12 nmi (22 km; 14 mi)	Trinity House	114-1048
Needles Lighthouse		Alum Bay	Isle of Wight	1859	31 m (102 ft)	24 m (79 ft)	17 nmi (31 km; 20 mi)	Trinity House	114-0584
North Foreland Lighthouse		North Foreland	Kent	1691	26 m (85 ft)	57 m (187 ft)	19 nmi (35 km)	Trinity House	114-1364
Pendeen Lighthouse		Pendeen	Cornwall	1900	17 m (56 ft)	59 m (194 ft)	16 nmi (30 km; 18 mi)	Trinity House	114-6304
Peninnis Lighthouse		Peninnis Head	Cornwall	1911	14 m (46 ft)	36 m (118 ft)	9 nmi (17 km; 10 mi)	Trinity House	114-8
Plover Scar Lighthouse		Cockersand Abbey	Lancashire	1847	8 m (26 ft)	6 m (20 ft)	6 nmi (11 km; 6.9 mi)	Lancaster Port Commission	114-5144
Plymouth Breakwater Lighthouse		Plymouth Breakwater	Devon	1844	23 m (75 ft)	19 m (62 ft)	12 nmi (22 km; 14 mi) (white), 9 nmi (17 km; 10 mi) (red)	Ministry of Defence (from 1993), Trinity House (until 1993)	114-148
Portishead Point Lighthouse		Portishead	Somerset	1931	9 m (30 ft)	9 m (30 ft)	16 nmi (30 km; 18 mi)	Port of Bristol	114-6144
Portland Bill Lighthouse		Portland Bill	Dorset	1903	41 m (135 ft)	43 m (141 ft)	25 nmi (46 km; 29 mi)	Trinity House	114-0448
Portland Breakwater Lighthouse		Isle of Portland	Dorset	1905	22 m (72 ft)	22 m (72 ft)	10 nmi (19 km; 12 mi)	Portland Harbour Authority	114-0464
Rampside Lighthouse		Rampside	Cumbria	1875	16 m (52 ft)	14 m (46 ft)	14 nmi (26 km; 16 mi)	Port of Barrow	114-5076
Ramsgate West Pier Lighthouse		Ramsgate	Kent	1842	11 m (36 ft)	12 m (39 ft)	7 nmi (13 km; 8.1 mi)	Port of Ramsgate	114-1348
Roker Pier lighthouse		Roker	Tyne and Wear	1903	23 m (75 ft)	25 m (82 ft)	23 nmi (43 km; 26 mi)	Port of Sunderland	114-2084
Round Island Lighthouse		Tresco	Cornwall	1887	19 m (62 ft)	55 m (180 ft)	18 nmi (33 km; 21 mi)	Trinity House	114-16
St Anthony's Lighthouse		St Anthony Head	Cornwall	1835	19 m (62 ft)	22 m (72 ft)	16 nmi (30 km; 18 mi) (white), 14 nmi (26 km; 16 mi) (red)	Trinity House	114-68
St Bees Lighthouse		St Bees Head	Cumbria	1822	17 m (56 ft)	102 m (335 ft)	18 nmi (33 km; 21 mi)	Trinity House	114-4892
St. Catherine's Lighthouse		St. Catherine's Point	Isle of Wight	1838	27 m (89 ft)	41 m (135 ft)	25 nmi (46 km; 29 mi)	Trinity House	114-1064
Scarborough Lighthouse		Scarborough	Yorkshire	1931	15 m (49 ft)	17 m (56 ft)	9 nmi (17 km; 10 mi)	North Yorkshire Council	114-1976
Shoreham Lighthouse		Kingston by Sea	Sussex	1846	12 m (39 ft)	13 m (43 ft)	10 nmi (19 km; 12 mi)	Shoreham Port Authority	114-1116
South Gare Lighthouse		South Gare	Yorkshire	1884	13 m (43 ft)	16 m (52 ft)	20 nmi (37 km; 23 mi) (white), 17 nmi (31 km; 20 mi) (red)	PD Ports	114-2020
Southwold Lighthouse		Southwold	Suffolk	1887	31 m (102 ft)	37 m (121 ft)	24 nmi (44 km; 28 mi)	Trinity House	114-1588
Start Point Lighthouse		Start Point	Devon	1836	28 m (92 ft)	62 m (203 ft), 55 m (180 ft)	25 nmi (46 km; 29 mi) (white), 9 nmi (17 km; 10 mi) (red)	Trinity House	114-0324
Tater Du Lighthouse		Tregurnow	Cornwall	1965	15 m (49 ft)	34 m (112 ft)	20 nmi (37 km; 23 mi)	Trinity House	114-0032
Teignmouth Lighthouse		Teignmouth	Devon	1845	6 m (20 ft)	10 m (33 ft)	6 nmi (11 km; 6.9 mi)	Teignmouth Harbour Commission	114-392
Thorngumbald Clough High Lighthouse		Paull	Yorkshire	1870	15 m (49 ft)	13 m (43 ft)	9 nmi (17 km; 10 mi)	Port of Hull	114-1932
Thorngumbald Clough Low Lighthouse		Paull	Yorkshire	1870	9 m (30 ft)	8 m (26 ft)	9 nmi (17 km; 10 mi)	Port of Hull	114-1928
Trevose Head Lighthouse		Trevose Head	Cornwall	1847	27 m (89 ft)	62 m (203 ft)	21 nmi (39 km; 24 mi)	Trinity House	114-6272
Tynemouth North Pier light		Tynemouth	Tyne and Wear	1903	23 m (75 ft)	26 m (85 ft)	26 nmi (48 km; 30 mi)	Port of Tyne	114-2104
Tyne South Pier light		South Shields	Tyne and Wear	1895	12 m (39 ft)	15 m (49 ft)	13 nmi (24 km; 15 mi)	Port of Tyne	114-2108
Walney Lighthouse		Walney Island	Cumbria	1804	24 m (79 ft)	21 m (69 ft)	23 nmi (43 km; 26 mi)	Lancaster Port Commission	114-5052
Watchet Harbour Lighthouse		Watchet	Somerset	1862	7 m (23 ft)	9 m (30 ft)	9 nmi (17 km; 10 mi)	Watchet Marina	114-6196
Whitby Lighthouse		Whitby	Yorkshire	1858	13 m (43 ft)	73 m (240 ft)	18 nmi (33 km; 21 mi)	Trinity House	114-1992
Whitby East Pier beacon		Whitby	Yorkshire	1914	7 m (23 ft)	12 m (39 ft)	5 nmi (9.3 km; 5.8 mi)	North Yorkshire Council	114-1988
Whitby West Pier beacon		Whitby	Yorkshire	1914	7 m (23 ft)	12 m (39 ft)	5 nmi (9.3 km; 5.8 mi)	North Yorkshire Council	114-1984
Whitby East Pier Lighthouse		Whitby, North Yorkshire	Yorkshire	1855	17 m (56 ft)			Whitby Harbour Board	
Whitby West Pier Lighthouse		Whitby	Yorkshire	1831	25 m (82 ft)			Whitby Harbour Board	
West Pier Lighthouse		Whitehaven	Cumbria	1839	14 m (46 ft)	16 m (52 ft)	6 nmi (11 km; 6.9 mi)	Whitehaven Harbour Commissioners	114-4880
Whitgift Lighthouse		Whitgift	Yorkshire		14 m (46 ft)	12 m (39 ft)		Associated British Ports	
Wolf Rock Lighthouse		Wolf Rock	Cornwall	1869	41 m (135 ft)	34 m (112 ft)	16 nmi (30 km; 18 mi)	Trinity House	114-28

== Inactive lighthouses ==
Name	Image	Location coordinates	County	First lit	Decommissioned	Tower height	Former operator(s)
Belle Tout Lighthouse		Beachy Head	Sussex	1834	1902 (Note: Replaced by Beachy Head Lighthouse.)	14 m (46 ft)	Trinity House (until 1902)
Bidston Lighthouse		Bidston Hill	Merseyside	1873	1913	21 m (69 ft)	Mersey Docks and Harbour Company (until 1913)
Black Nore Lighthouse		Portishead	Somerset	1894	2010	11 m (36 ft)	Trinity House (until Sep 2010)
Blyth High Light		Blyth	Northumberland	1788	1985	19 m (62 ft)	
Trinity Buoy Wharf		London Borough of Tower Hamlets	Middlesex	1863	1988		Trinity House (until Dec 1988) (Note: Formerly used for lighting trials for Trinity House.)
Brownsman Lighthouse		Farne Islands	Northumberland	1811	1826 (Note: Replaced by Longstone Lighthouse in 1826.)	12 m (39 ft)	Trinity House (from 1811 until 1826)
Burnham-on-Sea High Lighthouse		Burnham-on-Sea	Somerset	1832	1996	30 m (98 ft)	Trinity House (until 1993)
Burnham-on-Sea Round Tower		Burnham-on-Sea	Somerset	1801	1832 (Note: Replaced by High & Low lights in 1832.)		Trinity House (from 1829 until Dec 1832)
Chalk Tower		Flamborough Head	Yorkshire	1674	n/a (Note: Used as a daymark, but never lit.)	24 m (79 ft)	
Dovercourt High Light		Dovercourt	Essex	1863	1917	14 m (46 ft)	Trinity House (until 1917)
Dovercourt Low Light		Dovercourt	Essex	1863	1917	8 m (26 ft)	Trinity House (until 1917)
Dubris Pharos (Note: Also known as the Dover Pharos or Roman Pharos.)		Dover Castle	Kent	2nd century (Note: Dating varies from AD 50 to 150.)		19 m (62 ft)	
Dungeness Old Lighthouse		Dungeness	Kent	1904	1961 (Note: Replaced with Dungeness Lighthouse in 1961.)	44 m (144 ft)	Trinity House (until 1961)
Egypt Point light		Egypt Point	Isle of Wight	1897	1989	7.5 m (25 ft)	Trinity House (until 1989)
Ellesmere Port Lighthouse		Ellesmere Port	Cheshire	1880	1894	11 m (36 ft)	
Fish Quay High Light		North Shields Fish Quay	Tyne and Wear	1807	1999	18 m (59 ft)	Newcastle-upon-Tyne Trinity House (until 1990s), Port of Tyne
Fish Quay Low Light		North Shields Fish Quay	Tyne and Wear	1807	1999	26 m (85 ft)	Newcastle-upon-Tyne Trinity House (until 1990s), Port of Tyne
Fish Quay Old High Light		North Shields Fish Quay	Tyne and Wear	1727	1810		Newcastle-upon-Tyne Trinity House (until 1810)
Fish Quay Old Low Light		North Shields Fish Quay	Tyne and Wear	1727	1810		Newcastle-upon-Tyne Trinity House (until 1810), Tyne & Wear Building Preservation Trust
Gorleston Lighthouse		Gorleston-on-Sea	Norfolk	1878	2007	21 m (69 ft)	Great Yarmouth Port Authority (until 2007)
Gunfleet Lighthouse		Frinton-on-Sea	Essex	1850	1921	23 m (75 ft)	
Hale Head Lighthouse		Hale	Cheshire	1906	1958	17.5 m (57 ft)	
Harwich High Lighthouse		Harwich	Essex	1818	1863 (Note: Replaced by Dovercourt Lighthouses in 1863.)	21 m (69 ft)	Trinity House (until 1863), The Harwich Society
Harwich Low Lighthouse		Harwich	Essex	1818	1863	9 m (30 ft)	Trinity House (until 1863)
Hodbarrow Beacon		Millom	Cumbria	1866	1905 (Note: Replaced by Hodbarrow Haverigg Lighthouse in 1905.)	18 m (59 ft)	Hodbarrow Mining Company (until 1905)
Hodbarrow Haverigg Lighthouse		Haverigg	Cumbria	1905	1949	9 m (30 ft)	Hodbarrow Mining Company (until 1946), Hodbarrow Nature Reserve
Hoylake Lighthouse		Hoylake, Wirral	Merseyside	1865	14 May 1886	17 m (56 ft)	Mersey Docks and Harbour Company (until 1886)
Old Hunstanton Lighthouse		Hunstanton	Norfolk	1840	1922	19 m (62 ft)	Trinity House (until 1922)
Killingholme North Low Lighthouse		South Killingholme	Lincolnshire	1851	1920	14 m (46 ft)	Hull Trinity House (until 1920)
Leasowe Lighthouse		Leasowe	Merseyside	1763	1908	33.5 m (110 ft)	Mersey Docks and Harbour Company (until 1908)
Lundy Old Light		Torridge, Lundy	Devon	1820	1897	29 m (95 ft)	Trinity House (until 1897)
Maryport Old Lighthouse		Maryport	Cumbria	1846	1996	11 m (36 ft)	
New Brighton Lighthouse (Note: Also known as Perch Rock.)		New Brighton	Merseyside	1830	1973	28.5 m (94 ft)	Mersey Docks and Harbour Company (until 1973)
Orfordness Lighthouse		Orford Ness	Suffolk	1792	2013	30 m (98 ft)	Trinity House (until 2013)
Pakefield Lighthouse		Pakefield	Suffolk	1832	1864	9 m (30 ft)	Trinity House (until 1864)
Paull Lighthouse		Paull	Yorkshire	1836	1870	14 m (46 ft)	Hull Trinity House (until 1870)
Portland Bill High Light		Portland Bill	Dorset	1869	1906	12 m (39 ft)	Trinity House (until 1906)
Portland Bill Low Light		Portland Bill	Dorset	1869	1906	25 m (82 ft)	Trinity House (until 1906)
Royal Sovereign Lighthouse		Eastbourne	Sussex	1971	2022	36 m (118 ft)	Trinity House
St Agnes Lighthouse		St Agnes	Cornwall	1680	1911 (Note: Replaced by Peninnis Lighthouse in 1911.)	23 m (75 ft)	Trinity House
St Catherine's Oratory		St. Catherine's Down	Isle of Wight	1328	1547	11 m (36 ft)	English Heritage (Note: Britain's only remaining medieval lighthouse.)
St. Mary's Lighthouse		St Mary's Island	Tyne and Wear	1898	1984	46 m (151 ft)	Trinity House (until 1984)
Seaton Carew Lighthouse		Hartlepool	County Durham	1838 (Note: Rebuilt in Hartlepool in 1995.)	1892	19 m (62 ft)	Tees Navigation Company (until 1892)
Smeaton's Tower		Plymouth Hoe (Note: Moved from Eddystone to Plymouth Hoe in 1883.)	Devon	1759	1877	22 m (72 ft)	Trinity House (until 1879)
Souter Lighthouse		Marsden	County Durham	1871	1988	23 m (75 ft)	Trinity House (until 1984), National Trust
South Foreland Upper Lighthouse		South Foreland	Kent	1843	1988	21 m (69 ft)	Trinity House (until 1988)
South Foreland Lower Lighthouse		South Foreland	Kent	1846	1904	15 m (49 ft)	Trinity House (until 1910)
Southsea Castle lighthouse		Southsea Castle	Hampshire	1828	2017	10 m (33 ft)	Ministry of Defence (until 2017)
Spurn Lighthouse		Spurn Point	Yorkshire	1895	1985	39 m (128 ft)	Trinity House (until 1985)
Spurn Point Low Light		Spurn	Yorkshire	1852	1895	27 m (89 ft)	Trinity House (until 1895)
Winterton Lighthouse		Winterton-on-Sea	Norfolk	1840	1921	19 m (62 ft)	Trinity House (until 1921)
Withernsea Lighthouse		Withernsea	Yorkshire	1894	1972	38 m (125 ft)	Trinity House (until 1976)
Wyre Light		Fleetwood	Lancashire	1840	1979	12 m (39 ft)	
West Bank Lighthouse		Sutton Bridge	Lincolnshire	1830s		18 m (59 ft)	
East Bank Lighthouse		Sutton Bridge	Lincolnshire	1830s		18 m (59 ft)	

== See also ==
- Lists of lighthouses
- List of lighthouses in Wales
- List of lighthouses in Scotland
- List of lighthouses in the Isle of Man
- List of lighthouses in Ireland
- List of lighthouses in the Channel Islands
