= St Agnes Lighthouse =

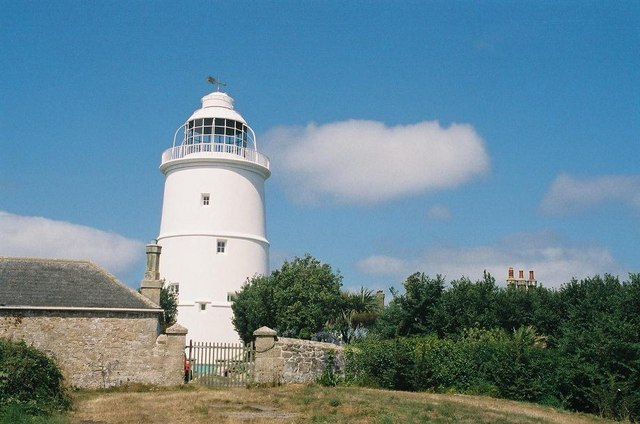
- Location: St Agnes, St Agnes, St. Agnes, Isles of Scilly, United Kingdom
- OS grid: SV8802008202
- Coordinates: 49°53′33″N 6°20′44″W

Tower
- Constructed: 1680
- Height: 74 ft (23 m)
- Operator: Trinity House
- Heritage: Grade II* listed building, scheduled monument

Light
- Deactivated: 1911

St Agnes lighthouse is a 17th-century lighthouse situated on St Agnes on the Isles of Scilly. It was the second to be built in the western approaches (after the Lizard lighthouse of 1619); it was also only the second lighthouse station to be established by Trinity House (after Lowestoft in 1609).

In 1680 Trinity House began a survey of the coasts of England as it was known that the contemporary charts were inaccurate; the Isles of Scilly was plotted ten miles to the north. On 24 May that year, Trinity House was given permission to erect and maintain one or more lighthouses on the islands. St Agnes was chosen as it is the most westerly of the habitable islands and close to the collection of rocks, tidal flows and currents, now known as the Western Rocks.

The lighthouse was built in 1680 and stands 74' above the ground, and 138' above mean high water; the incorporation of gun ports in the structure of the tower is an unusual feature. A plaque records the original construction by Captains Hugh Hill and Simon Bayly (builders of the 1676 Lowestoft lighthouse). There were two protests against the building of the St Agnes light: officials from the Isle of Wight complained that they would lose revenue from harbour dues and victualling as shipping would prefer to use the Isles of Scilly, and the Governor of Scilly objected on the grounds that he would lose money from wrecks. Earlier petitions to build a lighthouse on St Agnes (submitted by private individuals and companies in 1665 and 1679) had been refused.

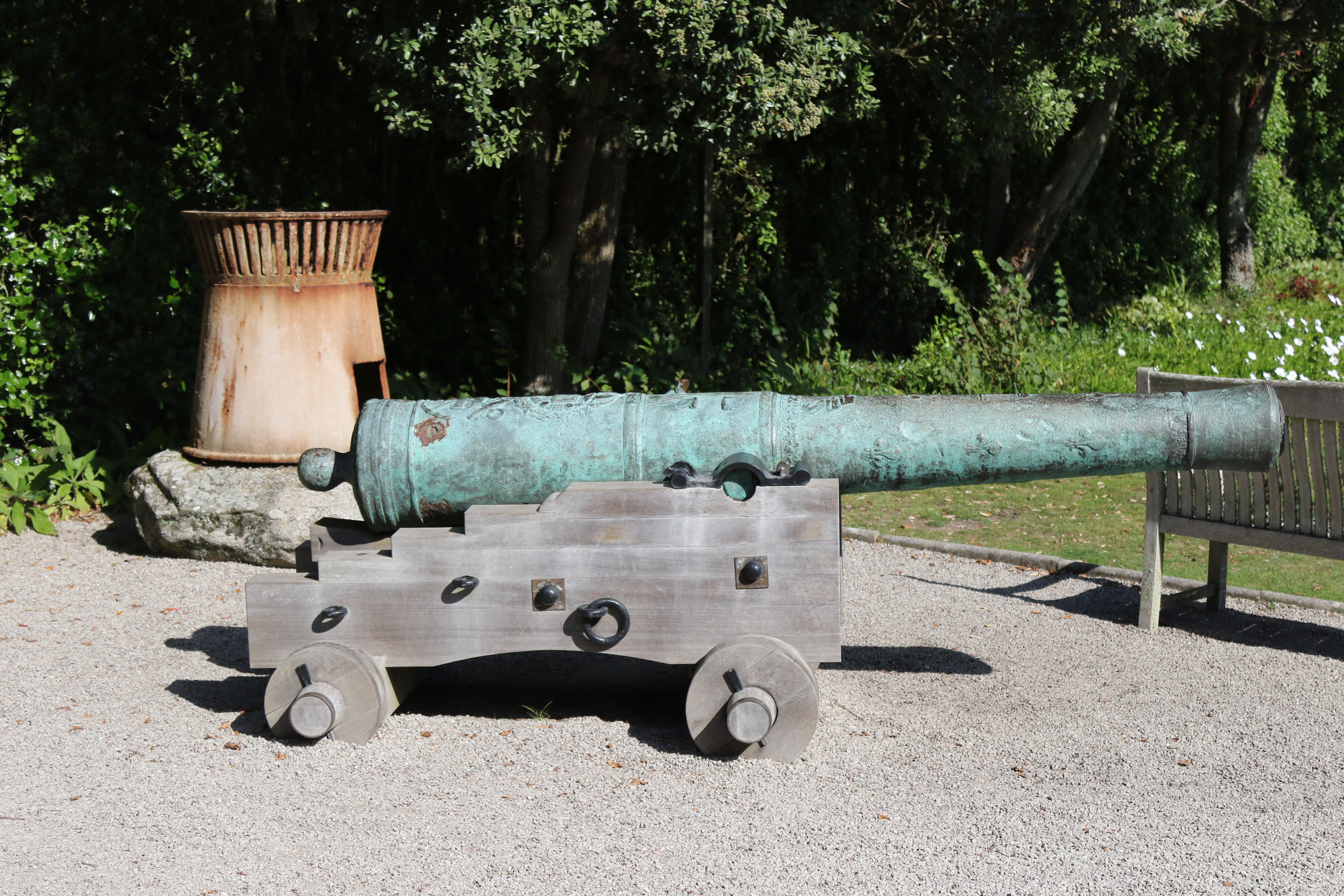
A rare surviving cresset (left) from the coal-fired lighthouse; now in Tresco Abbey Gardens.

The light was first lit on 30 October 1680; it was provided by coal burned within a brazier atop the tower. By 1756 the brazier was set within a lantern structure made up of 16 sash windows, roofed, with multiple chimneys. The lighthouse was coal fired until 1790, when it was converted to oil: twenty-one Argand lamps with reflectors, mounted on a three-sided revolving array. This 'very novel and ingenious operation' represented an innovation in optic design which was subsequently adopted in other lighthouses, including those at Cromer and Flamborough Head. In 1806 the lantern structure at the top of the tower was rebuilt (as seen today) to accommodate an enlarged three-sided revolving array of 30 lamps, each with a 21-inch reflector.

After the completion of Bishop Rock Lighthouse in 1858, St Agnes's lost its status as a landfall light and England's westernmost lighthouse. It was, in any case, prone to fog (due not least to its inland location). In 1880 the optical equipment was upgraded: it now consisted of fourteen reflectors and lamps (two-wick mineral oil burners), arranged (in two tiers, three above and four below) on opposite sides of a revolving square frame. The speed of rotation was increased, to give a flash every thirty seconds (rather than, as previously, every minute). A further upgrade took place in 1891, supervised by the chief engineer of Trinity House, Sir James Douglass with the new light much more powerful than the old one. Heavy mineral oil (flash point of 280 degrees) replaced ″colza″. In 1911 the St Agnes lighthouse was decommissioned, having been superseded by Peninnis Lighthouse (a 17-metre-tall black and white steel lattice tower situated on the southern extremity of St. Mary's island). The old lighthouse tower continues to be maintained as a daymark for shipping.

The lighthouse is a Scheduled Monument and a Grade II* listed building.
