= Severn bore =

Tidal bore seen on the tidal reaches of the River Severn in south western England

Coordinates: 51.850°N 2.332°W

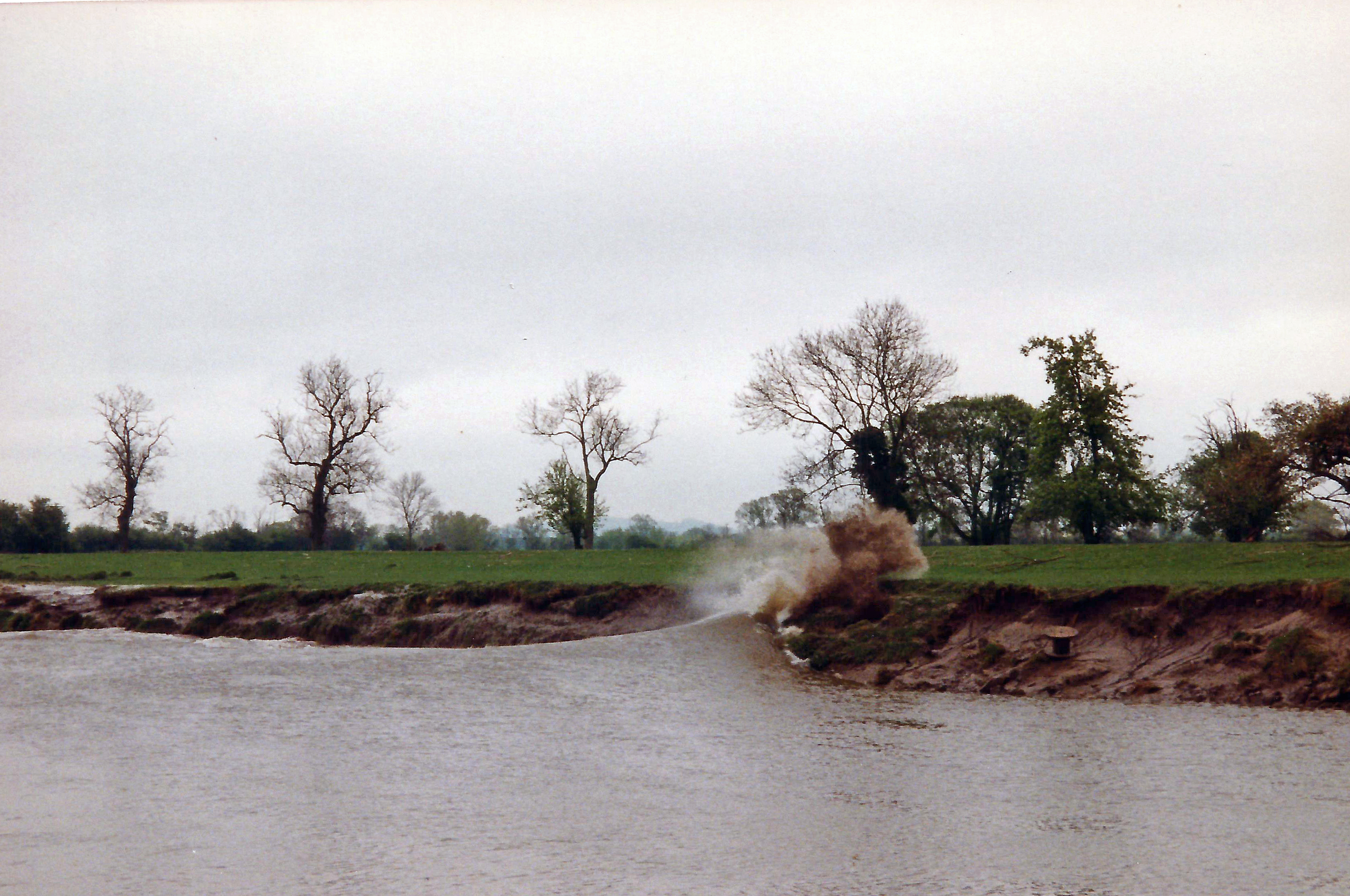
Bore hitting the riverbank in 1994

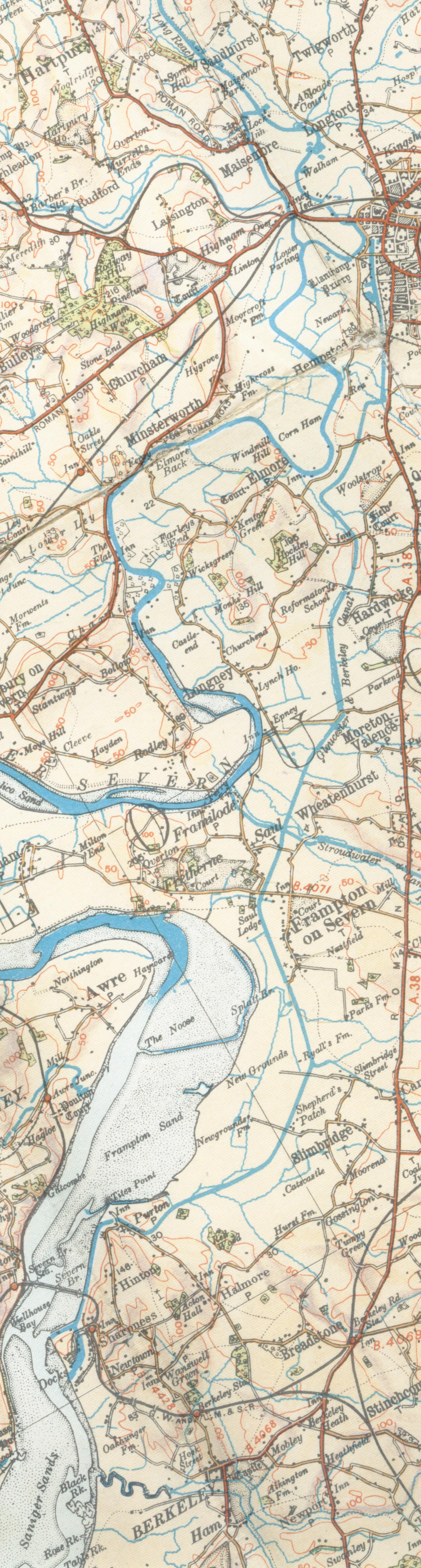
Parts of the River Severn affected by the bore

The Severn bore is a tidal bore seen on the tidal reaches of the River Severn in south western England. It is formed when the rising tide moves into the funnel-shaped Bristol Channel and Severn Estuary and the surging water forces its way upstream in a series of waves, as far as Gloucester and beyond. The bore behaves differently in different stretches of the river; in the lower, wider parts it is more noticeable in the deep channels as a slight roller, while the water creeps across the sand and mudflats. In the narrower, upper reaches, the river occupies the whole area between its banks and the bore advances in a series of waves that move upstream. Near Gloucester, the advancing water overcomes two weirs, and sometimes one in Tewkesbury, before finally petering out.

Bores are present on about 130 days in the year, concentrated on the days immediately following the new and full moon. The size and precise timing of the bore depend on such things as the time of high tide, the barometric pressure, the wind speed and direction, the amount of water coming down the river and how well scoured the main drainage channels are. There are a number of viewpoints from which the bore can be seen, or viewers can walk along the river bank or floodbanks. Historically, the bore has been of importance to shipping visiting the docks at Gloucester, but this was alleviated by the construction of an alternative route, the Gloucester and Sharpness Canal, which opened in 1827. Nowadays the bore is of interest to surfers and canoeists who attempt to ride the waves.

== Formation ==
The Severn Estuary, which empties into the Bristol Channel, has one of the largest tidal ranges in the world – about 13 m (43 ft). It is exceeded only by those in the Bay of Fundy and Ungava Bay, both in Canada.

The tidal wave starts far out in mid-ocean. It moves towards the continent of Europe at about 700 miles (1100 km) wide. When it reaches the continental shelf, its width decreases to about 200 miles (320 km) wide, and its amplitude increases. Approaching the Bristol Channel, a segment of the wave has to accommodate to the ever-decreasing width by raising its height. When it reaches the Severn proper, its width has decreased from 160 km (100 mi) or so to less than 8 km (5 mi), and its height is nearly 15 m (50 ft). As the bed of the estuary starts to rise and the sides continue to converge, the bore forms and begins to surge up the river in a tidal stream. The front edge of the wave is steep and the trailing edge flatter. The bore consists of three or four sizeable waves followed by a few of diminishing size. As with other waves, the wave tends to break in shallow places and near the bank, and flow smoothly in deep water. The wave travels upstream against the river current at a speed of 13 to 21 km/h (8 to 13 mph).

In the lower, broader part of the estuary near Avonmouth, the tidal surge advances as a slight roll in the deepwater channels and the water rapidly spreads across the sands and mudbanks. Often, the Severn Bore floods the lower village of Pill if flood defences are not closed. Past Sharpness, the bore begins to form and when it encounters the large left-handed bend at Hock Cliff, it crashes headlong into the rocks. Reforming, it runs up-river close to the Overton shore before crossing the estuary towards Box Cliff. As it rounds the Horseshoe Bend it keeps to the outside but it afterwards moves across to the eastern side of the river. Above Longney Sands, the river abruptly narrows to a hundred yards, the sands diminish and the channel occupies the whole of the river. Now the bore is recognisably the spectacular phenomenon that people expect rather than a swelling flood of water. From Minsterworth to Gloucester, the width of the river varies little and the bore continues unhindered, climbing the banks on the outer side of bends and breaking over shallow places. At Lower Parting, close to Gloucester, it splits in two to pass either side of Alney Island. Both branches encounter and overcome weirs and rejoin at Upper Parting, and the much diminished bore continues upstream. In particularly high tides the water may overtop the weir at Tewkesbury, and even the foot of the weir at Worcester may experience a rise in water level of a foot (30 cm) or so.

== Timing ==
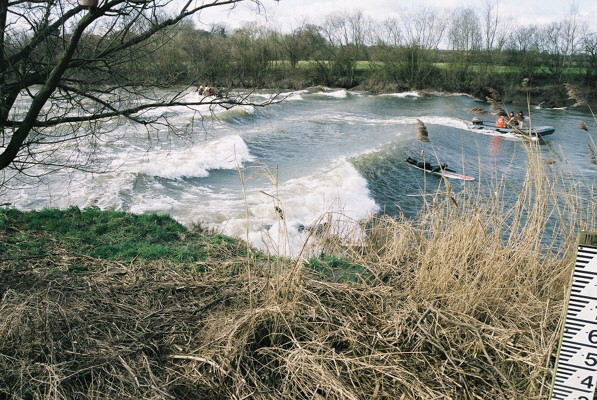
The Severn bore near Over Bridge

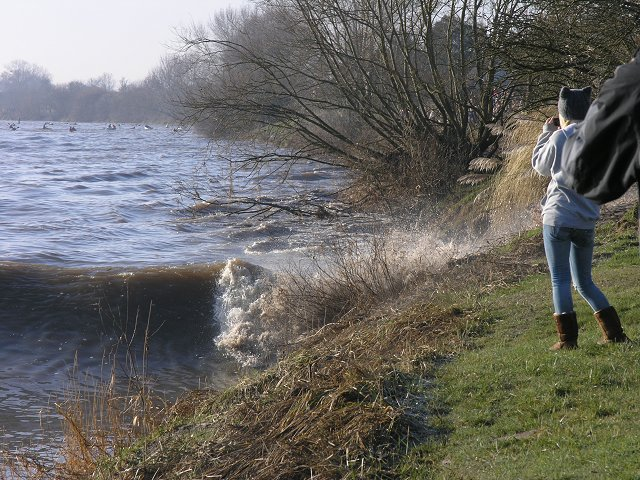
This bore, near the Severn Bore Inn, was smaller than predicted.

The largest bores occur around the times of the equinoxes but smaller ones can be seen throughout the year. There are about 260 bores in each year occurring twice a day on 130 days. Because the bores are associated with the phases of the moon, one occurs between 7 a.m. and noon on bore days, and the other between 7 p.m. and midnight GMT, with the largest bores occurring between 9 and 11 in both the morning and evening. Maximum bores occur between one and three days after new and full moons, and smaller ones on the days that precede and follow the maxima.

Timetables for the bore and predictions of bore heights are published each year; however, the heights and timings are subject to minor variations. The bore height is increased by a strong southwest or west wind, low barometric pressure, about 0.6 m (2 ft) of fresh water below Gloucester and well-scoured channels in the estuary. The height is decreased by strong winds from the east or north, high barometric pressure and little fresh water below Gloucester or excessive fresh water. The bore is made earlier by strong southwest or west wind, low barometric pressure, between two and five feet of fresh water, and shorter and well-scoured channels in the estuary. Conversely, it is delayed by strong winds from the east or north, high barometric pressure, little fresh water and more meandering, poorly scoured channels. The wind direction out at sea is of more significance than the local air-flow.

Being the onset of the flood tide, the bore is accompanied by a rapid rise in water level which continues for about one and a half hours after the bore has passed. The Severn bore is not a self-reinforcing solitary wave or soliton but rather a shock wave which is formed because the wave is travelling faster than the wave speed in water above the bore (see tidal bore for more details). The passing of the bore causes a churning of the water, and the myriads of tiny bubbles popping contributes much of the roaring sound made by the bore. The largest recorded bore was on 15 October 1966, when it reached a height of 2.8 m (9.2 ft) at Stonebench.

== Viewpoints ==
There are a number of viewpoints from which the bore can be seen; viewers do not have to restrict themselves to these because most of the river banks and floodbanks are public footpaths. Crowds often assemble at popular viewing points and car parking may prove difficult. Related to the time of the high tide at Sharpness, the bore passes Newnham on Severn one hour before this, Framilode and Arlingham, twenty-five minutes before, Epney twenty minutes before, Minsterworth at the high tide, Stonebench, on the east bank, fifteen minutes after the high tide and Over Bridge thirty-five minutes afterwards.

One of the main viewpoints is at Minsterworth at the Severn Bore Inn on the A48. Another good place to see the spectacle is Over Bridge, but the view here is rather restricted by the adjacent railway bridge.

== Transport and surfing ==
The River Severn is considered a navigable river and Gloucester used to be an important port, with shipping having to deal with the bore. Vessels can ride the tide up from Sharpness to Gloucester. The tide will outstrip the vessel but by timing the journey correctly, a barge can reach Gloucester at high water. Descending is more difficult, and barges often needed to start their descent with one tide, lay up before crossing Longney Sands, and finish the descent at the next tide. These inconveniences in accessing Gloucester were overcome when the Gloucester and Sharpness Canal was opened in 1827, bypassing the need for shipping to use the river to reach Gloucester.

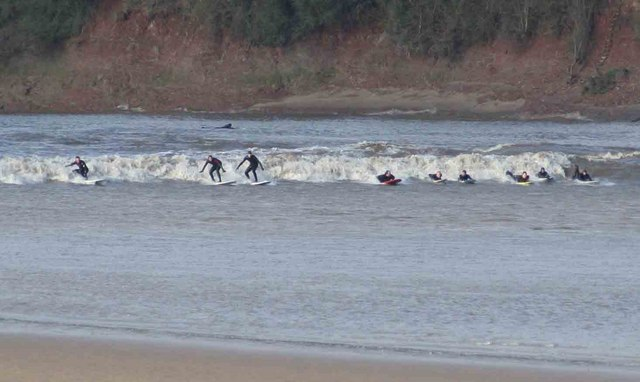
Surfers riding the Severn bore

River surfing enthusiasts attempt to surf along on the wave, which can be 2 m (7 ft) high. The river was first surfed in 1955 by World War II veteran Jack Churchill, a Military Cross recipient renowned both for carrying a Scottish broadsword, and for being the only Allied soldier to kill an enemy with a longbow during the war. He became a surfing enthusiast in his later life and rode the bore on a board he designed himself.

In September 2005, several hundred surfers gathered in Newnham on Severn to celebrate 50 years since the first recorded attempt at surfing the Severn bore and to view the première of Longwave by Donny Wright, a historical film documenting the evolution of the sport since its inception in 1955. In March 2006, Steve King, a railway engineer from Gloucestershire, set a world record for the longest surfing ride on a river bore while riding the Severn bore; King surfed up the river for a distance of 12 km (7.6 mi), a Guinness World Record.

On days when a large bore is expected, hundreds of surfing enthusiasts may accumulate, waiting for the waves to arrive. Hazards in high water conditions can include floating trees, collapsing portions of river bank, overhanging branches and even dead farm animals. The Gloucester Harbour Trustees, as competent harbour authority for this part of the river, have issued safety guidance for surfers, canoeists, small craft and river bank users in relation to the bore.

== Historical accounts ==
An eighteenth century account of the bore that has been attributed to Charles Blagden (died 1820), secretary of the Royal Society, is in the collection of the Gloucestershire Archives under reference Glos. R.O., D 1914. In the account, the author described it rising to eight feet and how he rode on horseback between bends in the river in order to "overtake" the bore as observers still attempt to do. The phenomenon is referred to as a "head of tide" with the author noting at the end that elsewhere such things are known as a "boar" or "bore".

== See also ==
- Trent Aegir
