= Maryport Lighthouse =

Maryport Lighthouses
- Location: Maryport, Maryport, United Kingdom
- Coordinates: 54°43′04″N 3°30′38″W
- Maryport Old Lighthouse
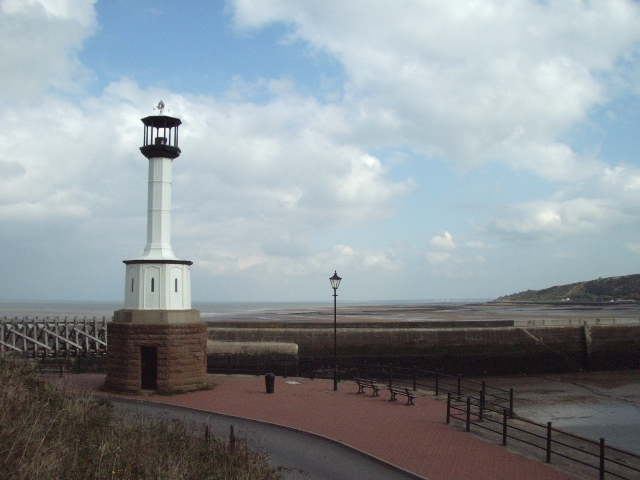
- Constructed: 1846
- Foundation: 1-storey stone octagonal prism basement
- Construction: cast iron (tower)
- Height: 11 m (36 ft)
- Shape: two-stage octagonal tower with lantern
- Markings: Unpainted (foundation), white (tower), black (lantern)
- Heritage: Grade II listed building
- Deactivated: 1996
- Maryport New Lighthouse
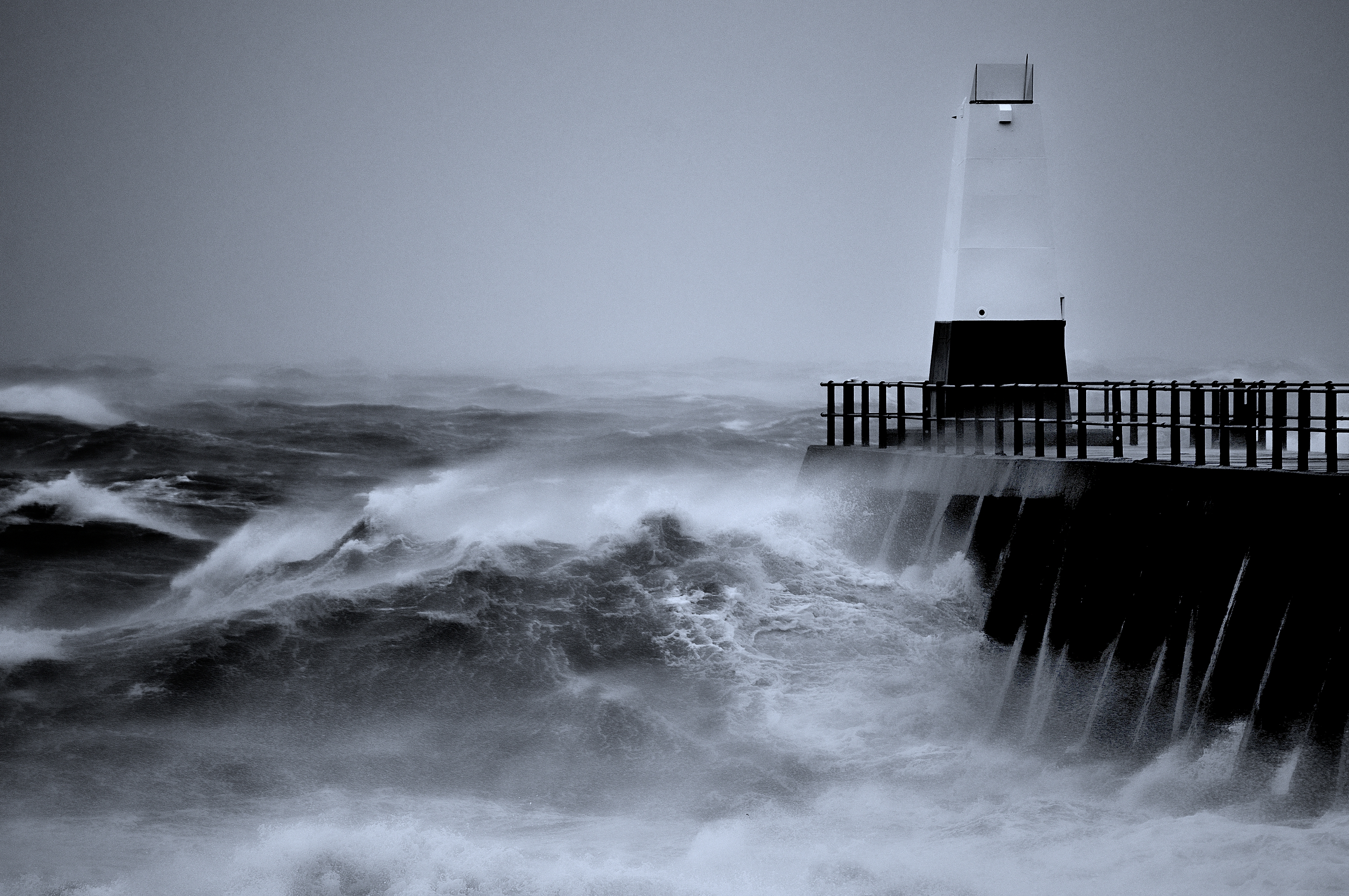
- The new light at the end of the pier extension
- Constructed: 1996
- Construction: aluminium (tower)
- Height: 4.7 m (15 ft), 6 m (20 ft)
- Shape: square
- Markings: White (tower), black (foundation)
- Power source: mains electricity
- Operator: Trinity House (–2010), Maryport Harbour Authority (2010–)
- First lit: 1996
- Focal height: 10 m (33 ft)
- Intensity: 120 candela
- Range: 6 nmi (11 km; 6.9 mi)
- Characteristic: Fl W 1.5s

Maryport Lighthouse is a small lighthouse located in Maryport, Cumbria, England, formerly run by England's general lighthouse authority, Trinity House. It is a Grade II listed building.

== 18th century ==
Maryport is said to have possessed a small lighthouse in 1796; five years later Robert Stevenson described it in a report as an oil lamp with two reflectors.

== 19th century ==
The Maryport Harbour and Improvement Act 1833 (3 & 4 Will. 4. c. cxiii) granted permission for a dock to be built at Maryport together with a new pier and lighthouse. Construction was overseen by a new board of trustees and the pier, complete with its lighthouse, was in place by 1846. Both remain in situ and the light is said to be the UK's oldest cast iron lighthouse (though it no longer serves as a navigation light). It is 36 feet (11 m) high and consists of an octagonal metal plinth, column and lantern on top of a rusticated stone base. It was originally gas-lit.

Subsequently, the harbour continued to expand. In 1852, following a storm, the south pier (on which the lighthouse stands) was extended, and a new light was provided at the end of the pier extension (described as a lantern on a post, lit by three gas jets) with a range of 6 nautical miles (11 km; 6.9 mi). The lighthouse thereafter served as a tidal light, being lit at night only for as long as there was 8 ft (2.4 m) of water within the harbour; (during the day it exhibited a red spherical day mark to signify the same). In 1858 the harbour trustees commissioned James Chance to manufacture a small (fourth-order) fixed optic for the lighthouse, which gave the tidal light a range of 12 nautical miles (22 km; 14 mi). The previous year, following completion of the Elizabeth Dock, additional (minor) lights had been installed on the north tongue and south jetty, within the harbour, coloured green and red respectively.

== 20th century ==
By 1946 the light was powered by acetylene. The painter L. S. Lowry used Maryport and the lighthouse in several of his paintings. Trinity House took charge of it in 1961.

In 1996 Trinity House provided a new aluminium tower (54.7178°N 3.5107°W) for the end of the pier extension, lit by mains electricity. At 4.7 metres tall and with a light intensity of only 120 candelas, the new tower was one of Trinity House's smaller beacons; it displays a flashing white light visible 6 nmi (6.9 mi) out to sea.

== 21st century ==
In 2010 Trinity House transferred responsibility for the new light to the Maryport Harbour Authority. The old lighthouse was restored and repainted in 2017 as part of a government-funded initiative for the refurbishment of seaside towns. Maryport Lighthouse was recognised during the 370th Council Meeting of the Round Table of Britain and Ireland.

== See also ==
- List of lighthouses in England
