= Bamburgh Lighthouse =

Lighthouse in Northumberland, England

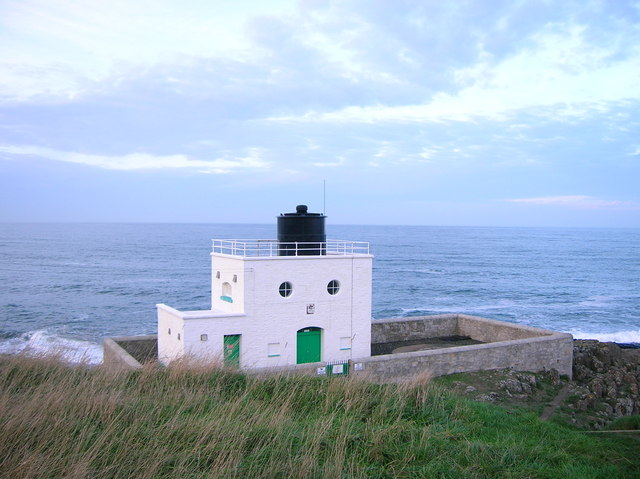
- Location: Bamburgh, Northumberland, United Kingdom
- Coordinates: 55°37′00″N 1°43′27″W

Tower
- Constructed: 1910
- Construction: masonry building
- Height: 9 m (30 ft)
- Shape: parallelepiped building with lantern on the roof
- Markings: white building, black lantern
- Operator: Trinity House

Light
- Focal height: 12 m (39 ft)
- Lens: 1st order catadioptric fixed lens
- Intensity: 7,140 candela
- Range: white: 14 nmi (26 km) red and green: 11 nmi (20 km)
- Characteristic: Oc(2) WRG 8s

Bamburgh Lighthouse (also known as Black Rocks Point Lighthouse) was built by Trinity House in 1910 to guide shipping both passing along the Northumberland coast and in the waters around the Farne Islands. It was extensively modernised in 1975 and is now monitored from the Trinity House Operations and Planning Centre in Harwich. Routine maintenance is carried out by a local attendant. It is the most northerly land-based lighthouse in England.

When originally built, the lamp was mounted on a 36 ft (11 m)-high skeletal steel tower (the footprint of which can still be seen within the compound) which stood alongside the white building which housed an acetylene plant to power the lamp. (A similar arrangement can be seen today at Peninnis Lighthouse in the Isles of Scilly.) The lamp was mounted within a fixed third-order dioptric optic. It was a sector light with a group occulting characteristic (showing two eclipses every 15 seconds). The light was electrified in 1967. Diesel generators were installed in the (redundant) acetylene building.

In 1975 the tower was removed, and a new lantern and lens were installed on top of the old acetylene building. In the 1980s the lighthouse was connected to mains electricity, the generators being retained as a standby provision.

== General references ==
- Rowlett, Russ. "Lighthouses of Northeastern England". The Lighthouse Directory. University of North Carolina at Chapel Hill.
