= Gorleston (Range Rear) Lighthouse =

Gorleston Lighthouse
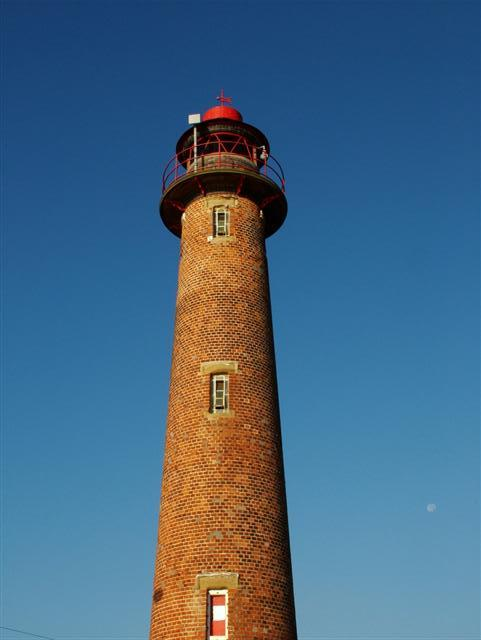
- Gorleston-on-Sea (Range Rear) Lighthouse
- Location: Gorleston-on-Sea; Norfolk; England
- OS grid: TG5300203686
- Coordinates: 52.572142°N 1.732305°E

Tower
- Constructed: 1887
- Construction: brick tower
- Height: 21 metres (69 ft)
- Shape: tapered cylindrical tower with balcony and lantern
- Markings: unpainted tower, red lantern roof
- Operator: Great Yarmouth Port Authority (–2007)
- Heritage: Grade II listed building

Light
- Deactivated: 2007
- Focal height: 20 m (66 ft)

Gorleston (Range Rear) Lighthouse is located near mouth of River Yare in the Gorleston-on-Sea area of Great Yarmouth in the English county of Norfolk. The lighthouse was built in 1887. Gorleston-on-Sea lighthouse carries two lights. The rear light for the harbour entrance range (white light, 4 seconds on, 2 seconds off) is mounted on the tower with a focal plane of 6.7 metres (22 ft); a fixed red light is also displayed from the gallery with a focal plane of 20.1 metres (66 ft).

== Gallery ==
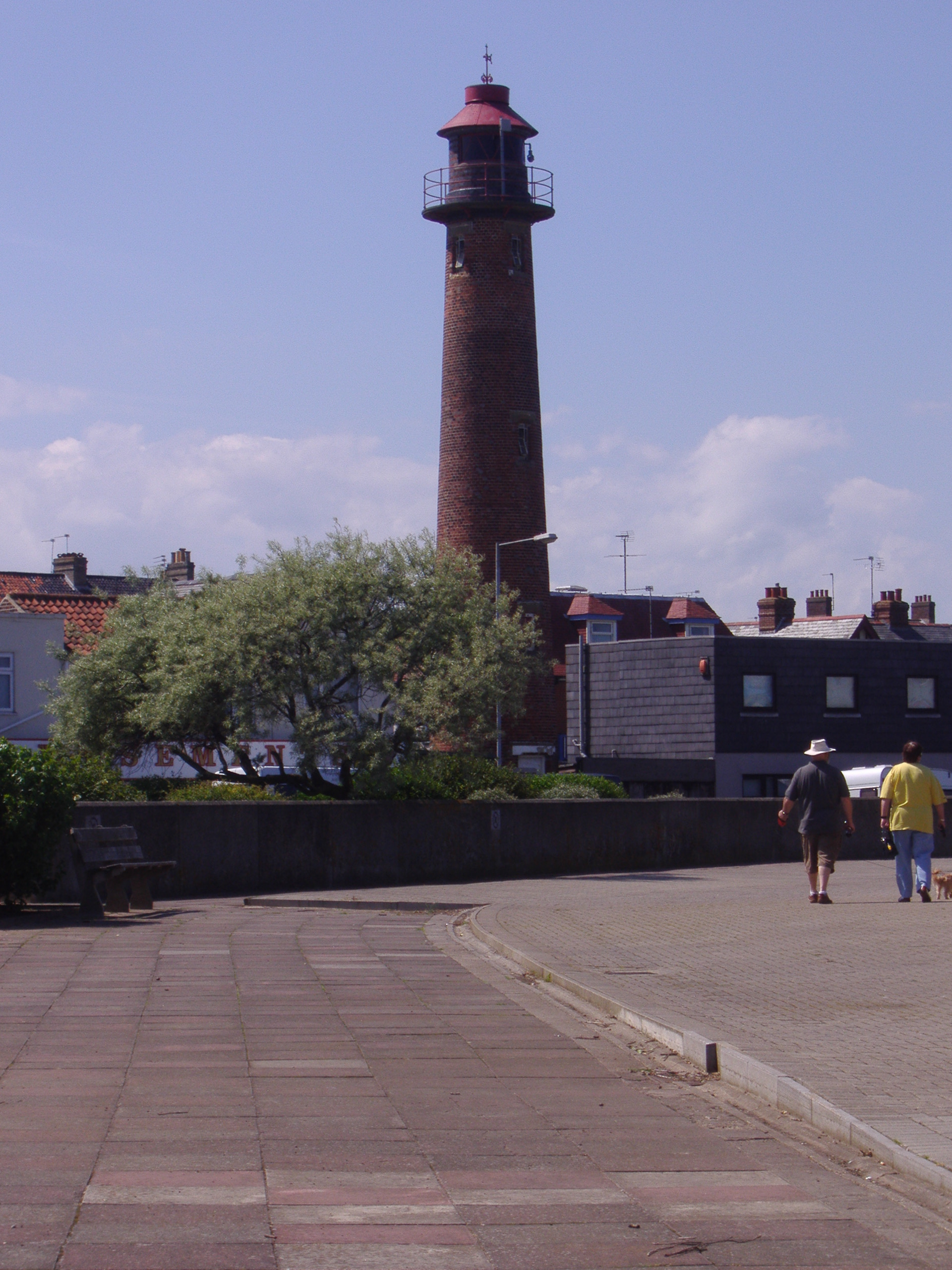

== See also ==
- List of lighthouses in England
