= Peninnis Head =

Headland on St Mary's, Isles of Scilly

Peninnis Head (St Mary's)
- Site of Special Scientific Interest
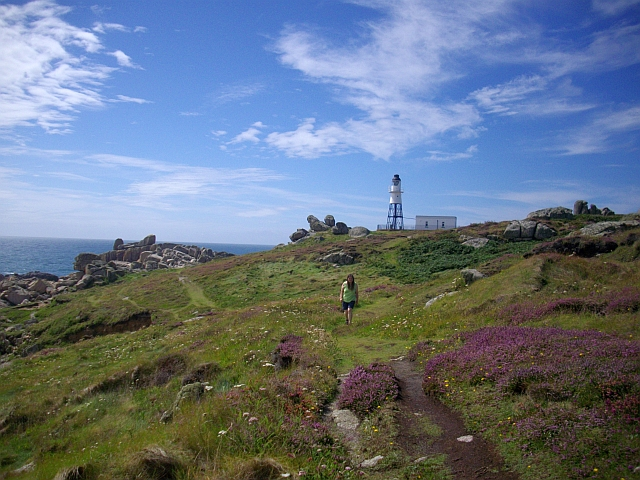
- Penninnis Head with lighthouse

- Location within Isles of Scilly
- Location of Peninnis Head (St Mary's).
- Area of search: Cornwall
- Grid reference: SV911094
- Coordinates: 49.9053°N 6.3029°W
- Interest: Biological and Geological
- Area: 16.1 hectares (0.161 km^{2}; 0.0622 sq mi)
- Notification date: 1971

Peninnis Head (Cornish: Penn Enys, meaning island head) is the southernmost point of St Mary's, Isles of Scilly. The headland is within the Isles of Scilly Area of Outstanding Natural Beauty and part of the Heritage Coast. It is also a Geological Conservation Review site for its Quaternary geomorphology and was first designated a Site of Special Scientific Interest (SSSI) in 1971 for both its biological and geological interests. All of the land designated as Peninnis Head SSSI is owned by the Duchy of Cornwall. On the tip of the headland is a squat lighthouse built in 1911 by Trinity House as a replacement for the 17th century lighthouse on St Agnes.

The Gilstone, a prominent rock off the eastern side of Peninnis Head, should not be confused with a rock of the same name in the Western Rocks.

== Geology ==
The headland is composed of coarse–grained Hercynian granite which has weathered to form cairns and natural sculptures with names such as the Pulpit Rock. In places head deposits have accumulated and thin podzolic soils have formed over the granite which is ideal for the formation of waved maritime heath vegetation. Peninnis Head is a Geological Conservation Review site because of the lack of glacial features which makes it possible to compare with sites, such as on Tresco in the north of the islands, where the granite has had some contact with glacial ice.

== Wildlife and ecology ==
Western gorse (Ulex gallii), heather (Calluna vulgaris) and bell heather (Erica cinerea) are the main components of the waved maritime heath and on the deeper soils bracken (Pteridium aquilinum), European gorse (U. europaeus), bramble (Rubus fruticosus) and honeysuckle (Lonicera periclymenum) are encroaching and devaluing the vegetation which is why the condition of the SSSI is considered to be unfavourable recovering. Grazing under a HLS agreement should help the vegetation to recover. Two unusual plants (for the Isles of Scilly) in the species–rich maritime grassland are spring squill (Scilla verna) and thyme (Thymus polytrichus). The dominant species are red fescue (Festuca rubra), Yorkshire fog (Holcus lanatus), thrift (Armeria maritima), sea beet (Beta vulgaris subsp. maritima), common sorrel (Rumex acetosa), common scurvygrass (Cochlearia officinalis) and buck's–horn plantain (Plantago coronopus). The nationally scarce early meadowgrass (Poa infirma) and western clover (Trifolium occidentale) also occur.

Lichens

The headland is exposed to salt–laden winds and sea spray, and a number of lichens grow at the extreme tip. They include the common sea ivory (Ramalina siliquosa), the nationally scarce Roccella fuciformis, R. phycopsis, and golden hair-lichen (Teloschistes flavicans); and the BAP species ciliate strap-lichen (Heterodermia leucomela).

== History ==
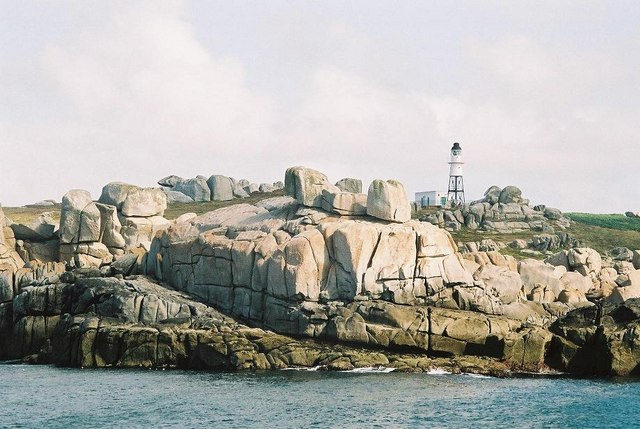
Peninnis Head as seen from a passing ship

During the Second World War (1939–45) a Radio Direction Finding Station (RDF) was built on Peninnis Head. The first hostile enemy action in the islands occurred on 21 August 1940 when aircraft bombed the RDF. The installation was attacked on several occasions and was destroyed just over a year after the first attack.

Peninnis Lighthouse was built in 1911 to replace the lighthouse in the centre of the island of St Agnes, which had been in operation since 1680. The light helps vessels to enter Hugh Town harbour via St Mary's Sound. Originally powered by acetylene (provided from tanks in the adjacent one-storey building) it was electrified in 1992.
