= Harwich High and Low Lighthouses =

Pair of early 19th-century towers in Harwich, Essex

- Location: Harwich, Essex, United Kingdom
- Harwich High Lighthouse
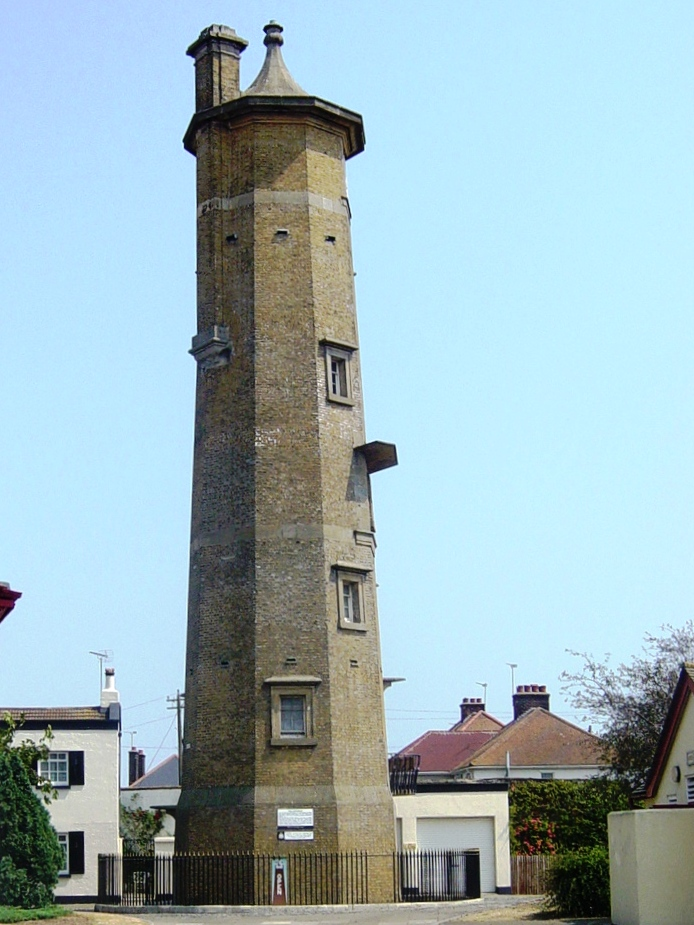
- Constructed: 1818
- Construction: brick (tower)
- Height: 21 m (69 ft)
- Operator: Trinity House (–1863), The Harwich Society
- Heritage: Grade II* listed building, scheduled monument
- Deactivated: 1863
- Harwich Low Lighthouse
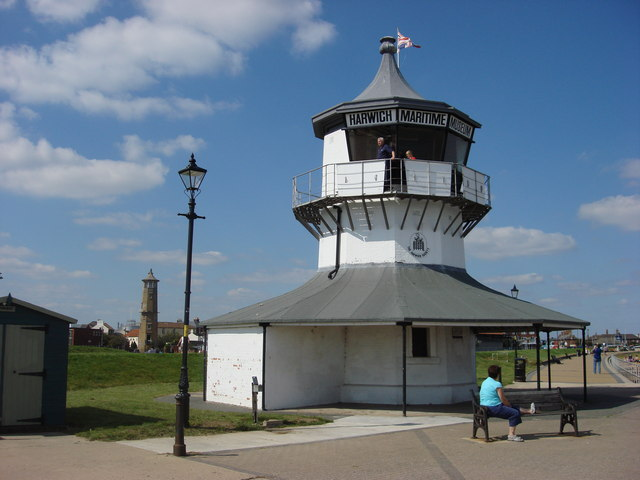
- Constructed: 1818
- Construction: brick (tower)
- Height: 9 m (30 ft)
- Operator: Trinity House (–1863)
- Heritage: scheduled monument, Grade II listed building
- Deactivated: 1863

Harwich High and Low Lighthouses are a pair of early 19th-century towers in Harwich, Essex, which were built as leading lights to help guide vessels into the harbour. They replaced an earlier pair of lights established in the seventeenth century when Harwich was a key operational base for the Royal Navy.

== History ==
=== The earlier lighthouses ===
On 24 December 1664, Sir William Batten, Surveyor of H.M. Navy, was granted a patent allowing him to set up lighthouses in Harwich. The lights were promptly built and were first lit the following year: the High Light, lit by a coal-fired hearth, was installed on top of the old Town Gate; whilst the Low Light, which stood some 200 yards (180 m) away on the foreshore, was a simple wooden tower (its light provided by a single candle in a hoistable lantern). The Elder Brethren of Trinity House (one of whom was Batten himself) had supported the proposal as 'useful and necessary (for the Navigation trading that way)'; however, when the patent was published it emerged that not only ships bound for Harwich and the haven ports, but also passing short-sea shipping traffic would be liable to pay tolls to Sir William for the upkeep of the lights. The payment (fixed by the patent) was to be 12 pence on every 20 chaldrons of coal, and one halfpenny per ton of other goods (for English ships, whereas for foreign ships the amount was doubled). Samuel Pepys (Batten's neighbour and contemporary) referred to this as 'the gift of a fortune'; it soon came to be resented by both Trinity House and the townspeople of Harwich.

In 1707 Sir Isaac Rebow (who had married Batten's granddaughter) sought and was granted a new lease for the lights. Twenty years later his grandson Isaac Leming Rebow rebuilt the Low Light; it was initially lit by six candles, but these were replaced by an oil lamp in 1764. (The rebuilt light features in a painting by John Constable.) As the end of the period of the lease drew near, a further extension of thirty-one years was granted to General Francis Slater Rebow, to begin on 5 January 1817; but only on condition that he build a new pair of towers and install up-to-date equipment.

=== The current lighthouses ===
In 1818, therefore, the old towers were replaced by the two brick-built structures which still stand today. They were built more-or-less on the site of their predecessors. The project was overseen by John Rennie, Senior; Rennie himself designed the Low Lighthouse, while the taller High Lighthouse was designed by Daniel Asher Alexander in a complementary style. They were lit using oil lamps and reflectors (nine in the high lighthouse, three in the low). Initially the high light was shown from a window halfway up the tower (at the same elevation as the old lighthouse), so that the upper part merely functioned as a daymark; but this proved unsatisfactory and from 1822 onwards the light shone from the top of the tower.

In 1836 Rebow's lease on the lights was purchased by Trinity House; however, the Corporation found that shingle deposits off Landguard Point were increasingly obstructing the line of approach indicated by the transit of the towers (they were by now commonly known as the 'misleading lights of Harwich'). A subsidiary red dioptric light was installed in the high tower in 1848 to shine from a lower window indicating the new alignment of the channel (at the same time a comparable green light was shown from a window in Landguard Fort); but the sands continued to shift and in 1863 the Harwich lights were declared redundant. They were replaced by the Dovercourt Lighthouses, a pair of cast iron lights at nearby Dovercourt.

==== After decommissioning ====
In the late 19th century a canopy was built around the base of the Low Lighthouse to provide shelter for walkers on the seafront. The two lighthouses were sold to the Borough Council in 1909 and the High Lighthouse was converted into a private dwelling; Tendring District Council carried out substantial renovations in 1975 to mark the European Year of Architectural Heritage. A clause in the deed of sale of the Low Lighthouse had stipulated that it should be returned to Trinity House if required for navigational purposes. This in fact took place in 1969 when it was converted to serve as a VHF station and lookout for Trinity House pilots (part of a new scheme for shipping and landing pilots from shore stations using fast launches). The upper balcony and angled windows were added at this time. It retained this role until a new purpose-built pilot station was opened at Angelgate in 1974.

== Current use ==
The two Harwich lighthouses can still be seen today, though they no longer function as lighthouses; both house small museums. The Low Lighthouse, a Grade II listed building, is home to the town's Maritime Museum, based there since 1980. The High Lighthouse (which is Grade II* listed) was leased to the National Vintage Wireless and Television Museum Trust in 1991 (having stood empty for a time prior to that date) to house their collection, which opened to the public in 1995. In 2014 the Harwich Society took over custodianship of the lighthouse, which now houses a museum of local interest.

The two Dovercourt lights, which were themselves decommissioned in 1917, also remain in situ.

== Gallery ==
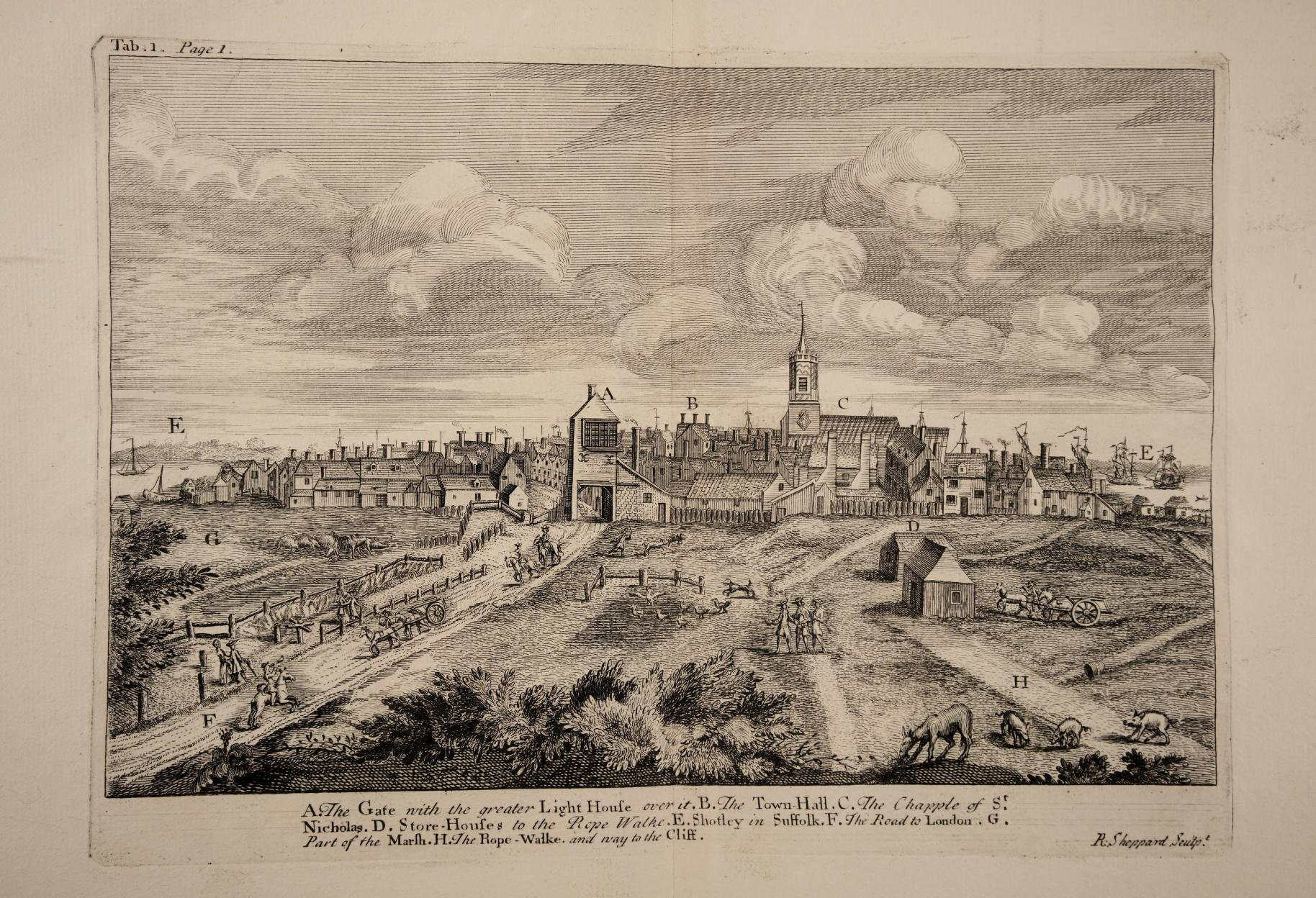
View of the Harwich, showing 'the greater Light House' over the town gate, c.1730.

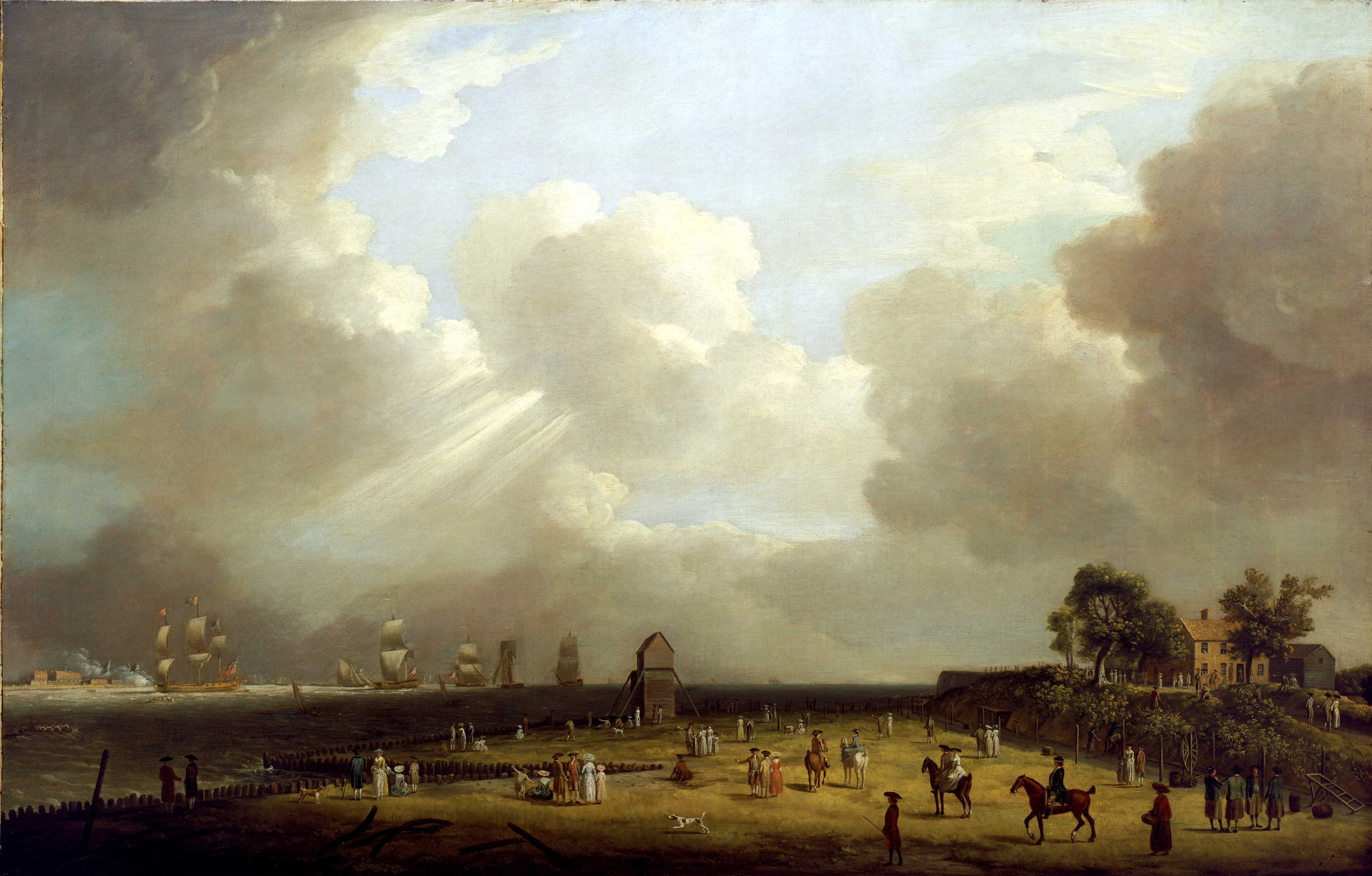
Princess Charlotte Arriving at Harwich by Dominic Serres, 1763

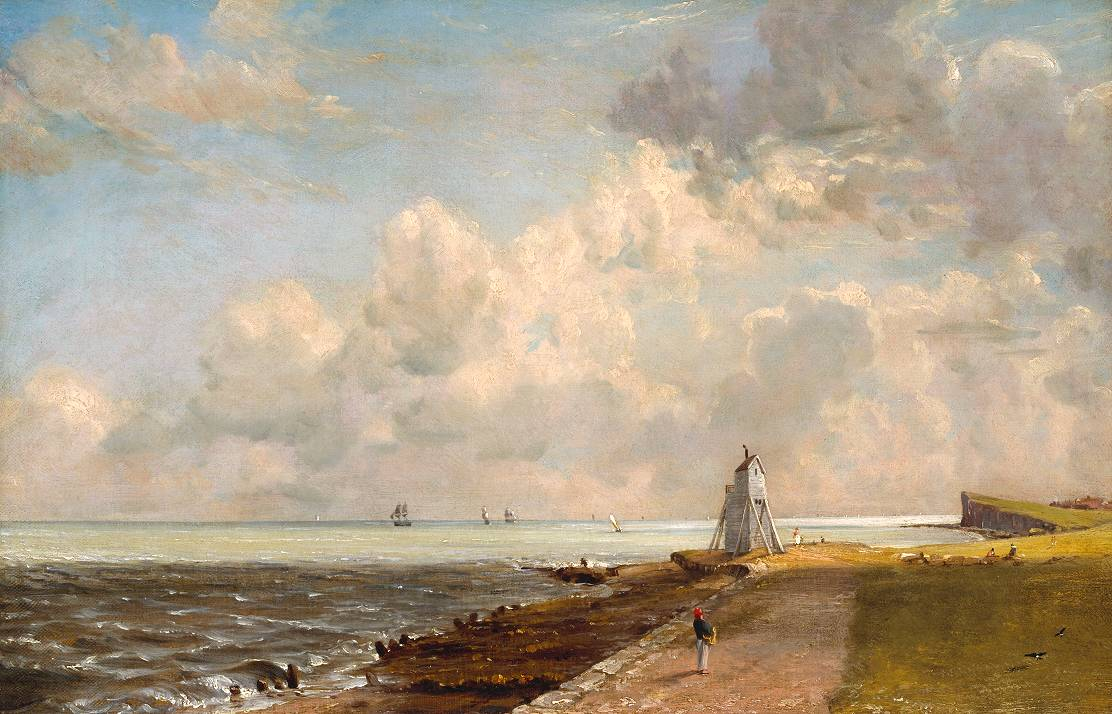
Harwich Lighthouse. Painting of the old Low Lighthouse by John Constable c.1820.

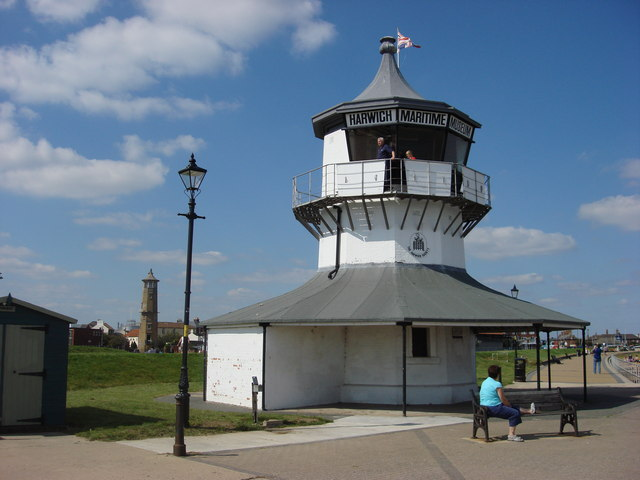
The Harwich Low Lighthouse of 1818 (with the High Lighthouse in the distance beyond)

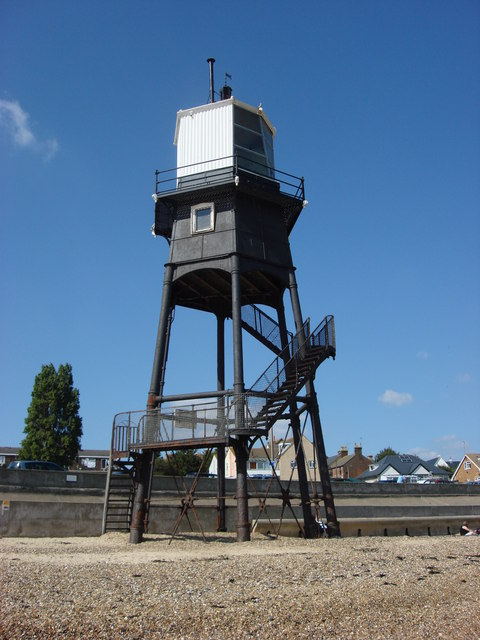
Dovercourt High Light (1863)

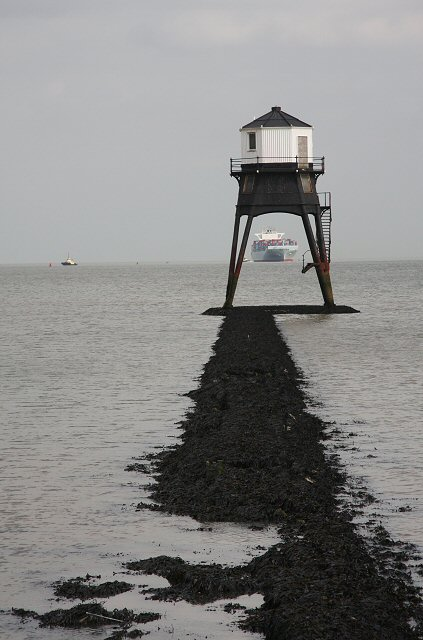
Dovercourt Low Light (1863)
