= Cromer Lighthouse =

Lighthouse in Cromer, Norfolk, England

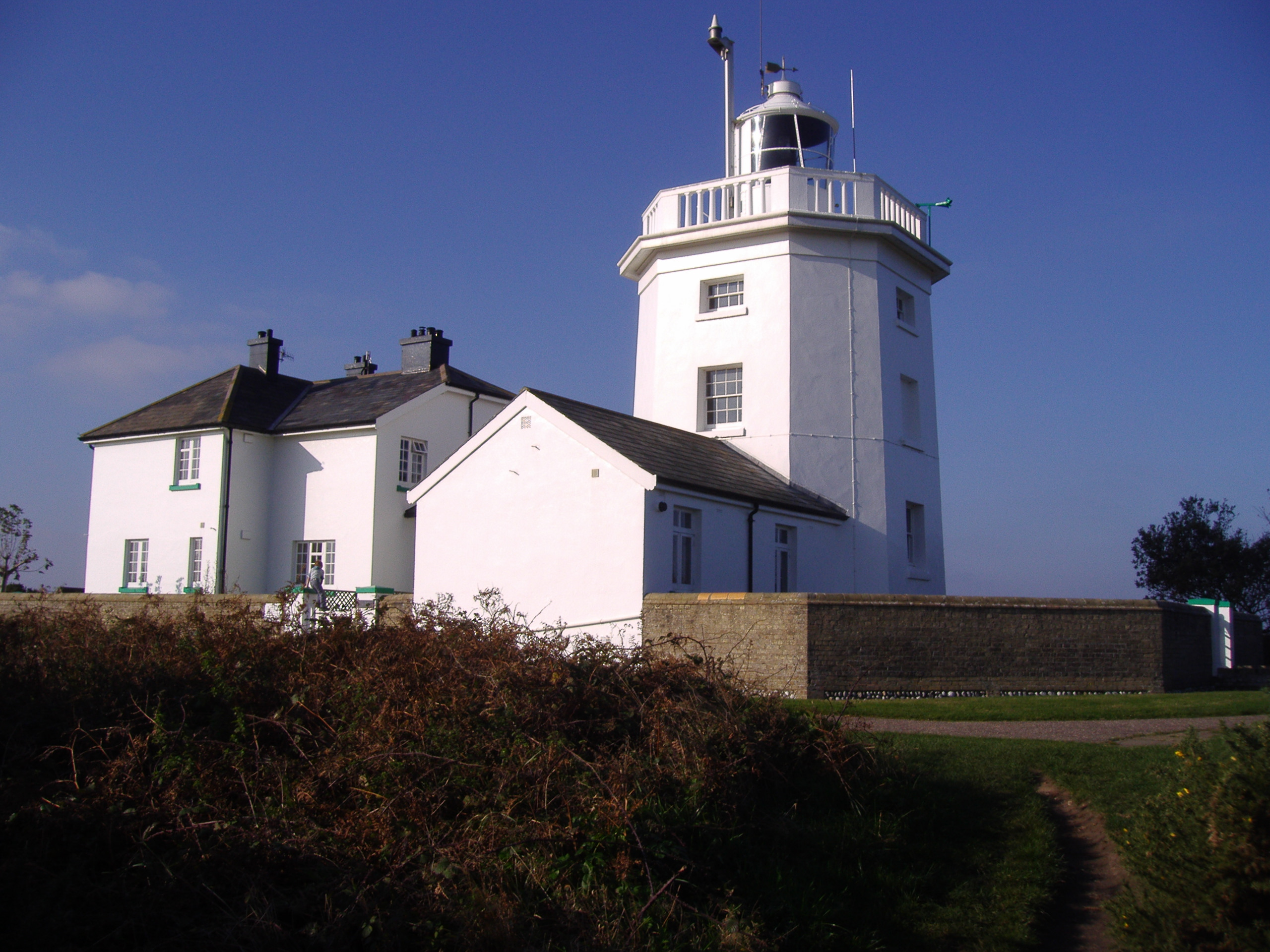
- Cromer Lighthouse
- Location: Cromer; Norfolk; England
- OS grid: TG2303641509
- Coordinates: 52°55′29″N 1°18′59.4″E

Tower
- Constructed: 1680 (first); 1719 (second)
- Construction: masonry tower
- Automated: 1990
- Height: 18 m (59 ft)
- Shape: octagonal tower with balcony and lantern
- Markings: white tower and lantern
- Power source: mains electricity
- Operator: Trinity House
- Heritage: Grade II listed building
- Racon: O

Light
- First lit: 1833 (current)
- Focal height: 84 m (276 ft)
- Lens: 3rd order catadioptric drum (1958-2025)
- Light source: LED lamp (2025-present)
- Intensity: 294,000 Candela
- Range: 21 nmi (39 km)
- Characteristic: Fl W 5s.

Cromer Lighthouse is situated in the coastal town of Cromer, in the English county of Norfolk.

== History ==
There has been a lighthouse on the cliff top at Foulness, east of the town of Cromer since 1669. Before this time a light was shone from the top of Cromer parish church to act as a guide to passing shipping. Although this light was small it had always been useful, as had many similar ecclesiastical lights that were dotted around the coastline of Great Britain from medieval times.

=== First proposals ===
Sir John Clayton proposed a lighthouse at Foulness, Cromer, along with five other lighthouses on four different sites (he planned lights at the Farne Islands off Northumberland, Flamborough Head in Yorkshire and Corton close to Lowestoft in Suffolk). In 1669 Clayton and his partner George Blake received from King Charles II a sixty-year patent for the four sites and work began to acquire land and erect the lighthouses. At Foulness, the local landowner William Reyes leased them a parcel of land on the cliff top 'for the purpose of erecting a Lighthouse for the benefit of Navigation'. In 1676 Clayton reported to the King that all five proposed lighthouses had been completed. Each tower cost the partners £3,000; their patent would last for 60 years with specified rates to be paid by the owners of passing vessels, though dues were only paid voluntarily.

The patent of 1669 was granted to Clayton and Blake "subject to them obtaining 500 Shipmasters' signatures as to convenience and willingness to pay". At this time, the Brethren of Trinity House were rigorously opposed to the establishment of lighthouses by private individuals, seeing this as an encroachment on their own established rights; so they lobbied against Clayton's enterprise among ship owners, and raised numerous legal objections. As a result, it seems that Clayton's lighthouse at Foulness was never lit (indeed, in 1677 he relinquished his patent rights); nevertheless, it was still of some use as a daymark, and continued to be marked on Admiralty charts as "a lighthouse but no fire kept in it" until it collapsed, as a result of coastal erosion, in around the year 1700.

=== A new lighthouse ===
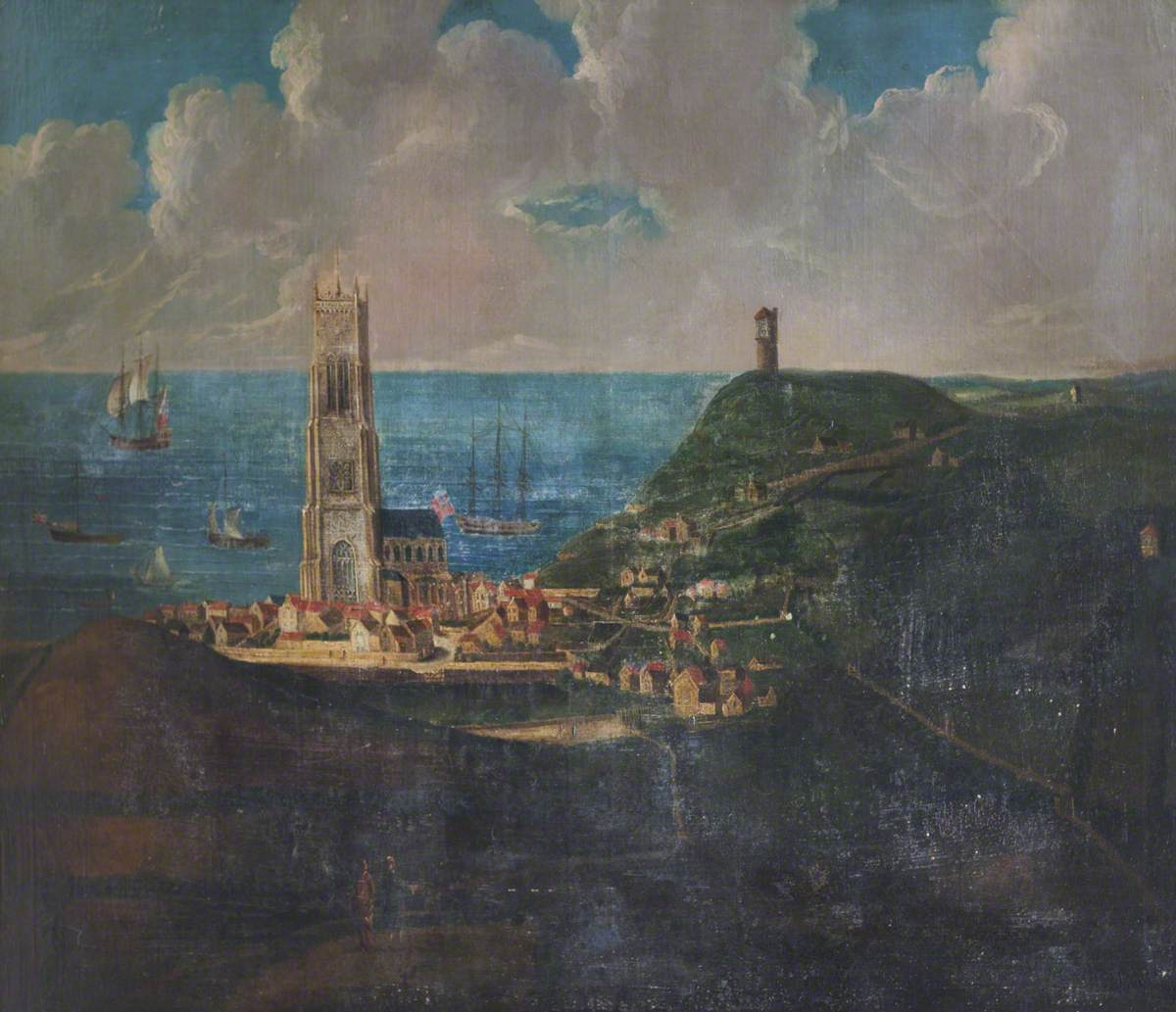
Early 18th-century view of the lighthouse on the cliff beyond Cromer.

Although Clayton's attempt had failed, individuals continued to maintain that a Lighthouse at this site was essential, and several appeals were made to the Corporation of Trinity House. In 1718, Edward Bowell, gent., of Ipswich, petitioned them for the right to erect a light, appending 'a Subscription of a great number of Masters of Ships using the Coal Trade and along that coast' indicating a willingness to pay the proposed light dues. The following year, it was resolved that:

"... if the said Edward Bowell were content to pay the Corporation the rent of one hundred pounds per annum and would at his own charge erect and constantly maintain the proposed lighthouse he may then apply in the name of the Trinity House for a Patent and the Corporation would grant him a lease for a term of 61 years commencing from the date of first kindling".

Later that year the new Patent was duly issued by King George I, jointly to Bowell and to Nathaniel Life (Reyes's successor as the owner of the land at Foulness). Dues were set to shipping at the rate of a farthing per ton of general cargo and a halfpenny per chaldron (25 cwt) of Newcastle coal.

The lighthouse was first lit on Michaelmas of that year; it was an octagonal brick tower, three storeys high, topped by a coal fire enclosed in a glazed lantern. In 1780 the lease, due to expire that year, was extended for a further period of 42 years.

==== Upgrade ====
Following the loss of several ships in a storm off the coast of East Anglia on 31 October 1789, there was pressure on lighthouse owners to make improvements to their lights. At Cromer, the decision was taken to fit the tower with oil-fired Argand lamps and parabolic reflectors, in place of the coal-fired brazier. These lamps were something of a novelty, Aimé Argand having only recently perfected his eponymous cylindrical-wick lamp (which provided a central current of air through the burner to ensure a more perfect combustion of the gas issuing from the wick); their use in lighthouses worldwide would soon become near-universal.

When lit anew on 8 September 1792, Cromer became only the second lighthouse in England (after St Agnes in 1790) to display a revolving, flashing light - a novelty which is said to have provoked irritation among seamen at the time. It was formed of fifteen Argand lamps and reflectors, mounted on a three-sided revolving frame (five on each side). Sperm oil was used in the lamps, costing 5s. to 8s. per gallon. The reflectors were of plated copper, each 3 ft (0.91 m) in diameter. The apparatus was driven by clockwork, and made a full revolution every three minutes; it had to be wound every five-and-a-half hours.

In 1822, the period of the lease came to an end, and Trinity House purchased the property outright; at the time it was still one of the most powerful lights on the English coast. In 1829 the lighthouse was described as brick-built, 'only three moderate stories high', and crowned with a lantern surrounded by a 'light iron gallery'. The keepers at this time were two young women, who jointly received a pound a week (plus perquisites) for their wage.

==== Shore erosion ====
The lighthouse's position at Foulness was becoming precarious due to rapid cliff erosion along this part of the North Norfolk coast. The sea's encroachment at the base of the cliff caused several land slips with serious slides recorded in 1799, 1825 and 1832. The latter encroachment prompted the building of a new lighthouse tower, further inland. Though extinguished, Bowell's tower remained standing for several years, eventually succumbing to the waves' actions in 1866 when, together with a sizeable portion of the cliff, it finally slipped down into the sea.

== The present lighthouse ==
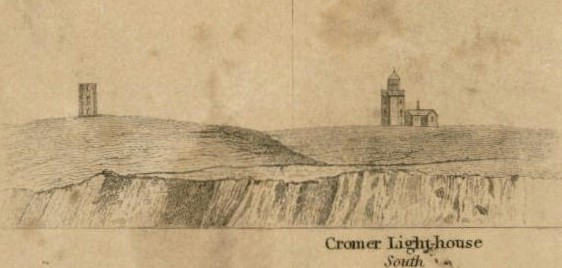
The new lighthouse (right) pictured alongside the remains of the old (left) on an Admiralty Chart of 1843.

With the expected destruction of the old lighthouse, plans to build a new lighthouse had been put into place long before the loss of 1866.

The present lighthouse was built half of a mile from the cliff edge (although it is now much closer), and came into operation in 1833. It is constructed of masonry and the tower is octagonal in shape and is 59 feet (18 m) tall. When built, the tower was topped by a much larger lantern than at present; it contained a revolving three-sided array of 30 oil lamps (ten on each side, each mounted within a parabolic reflector), which consumed around 1,100 imperial gallons (5,000 L; 1,300 US gal) of oil annually. The optical apparatus took three minutes to complete a full revolution, so the lighthouse continued to display one flash per minute; it was said to be visible up to a distance of 27 nautical miles (50 km; 31 mi).

By 1897 the equipment in the lantern had been upgraded: it now contained fourteen mineral oil lamps and reflectors, arranged in two divisions on either side of a frame which revolved on its vertical axis; it made a full revolution every two minutes (so preserving the lighthouse's characteristic of one flash every minute) and had a range of 27 miles.

=== Gas ===
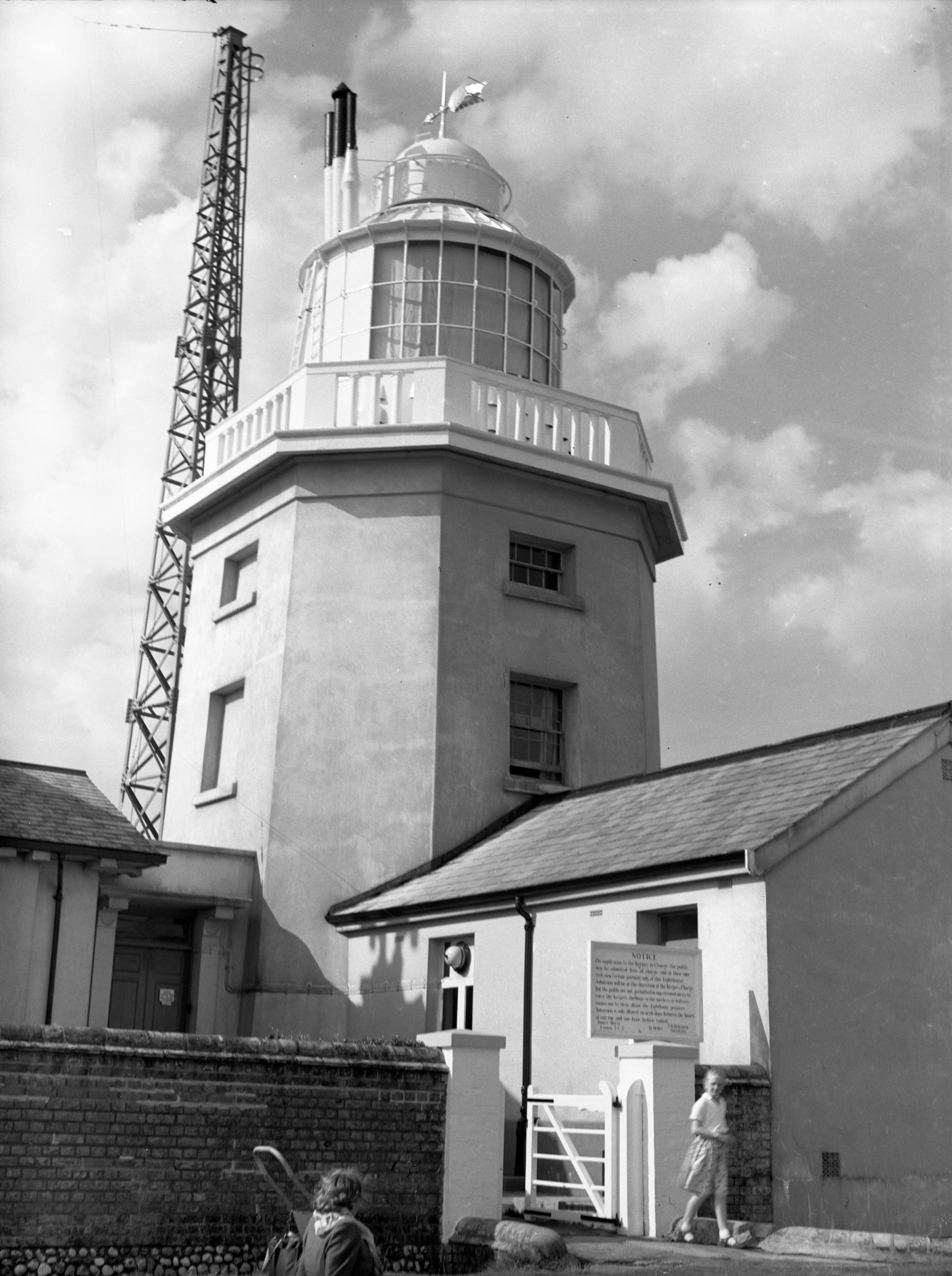
The lighthouse prior to electrification.

The lighthouse was converted to gas in 1905, when it was connected to the town's gas supply. Cromer was the only sizeable Trinity House lighthouse to make use of town gas as an illuminant (though it was also used for the minor lights at Blacknore and Northfleet). The old reflector array was adapted, with upright low-pressure Welsbach burners installed in the reflectors in place of the old Argand lamps. The arrangement of fourteen burners was retained, seven on each side of the revolving frame (they were mounted in two horizontal rows on each side, with four burners in the upper row and three in the lower); but the speed of rotation was increased, to one full revolution per minute (so as to display a flash every thirty seconds). Each lamp was rated at 7,000 candle-power, and the light was said to have a range of '20 miles to the horizon and from 15 to 18 miles beyond'.

=== Electrification ===
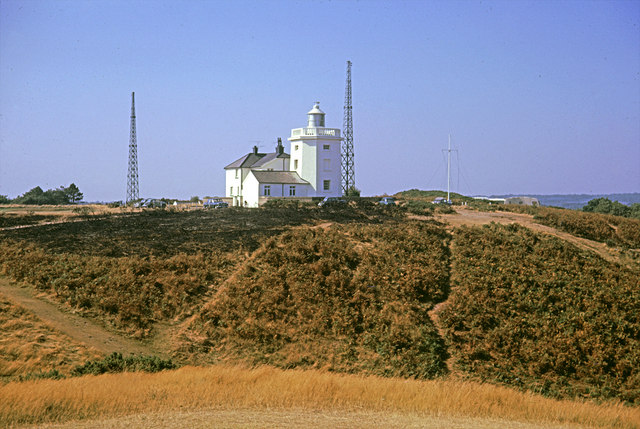
The lighthouse, with its recently replaced lantern, in 1964.

In 1935 the light was part-electrified, with some of the burners being replaced by electric lamps. For the next twenty-three years it was lit by a combination of domestic gas and mains electricity.

In the mid-1950s the lighthouse still employed a rotating array of fourteen 21-inch reflectors (each housing either a gas mantle or an incandescent light bulb). It was by this time the last major lighthouse in Britain equipped with reflectors rather than lenses.

Full electrification took place in 1958, when the array of reflectors was removed and a new optic was installed. At the same time the old lantern (the top storey of the tower) was removed and replaced with the current, much smaller one. The light is 275 feet (84 m) above sea level.

=== Automation ===
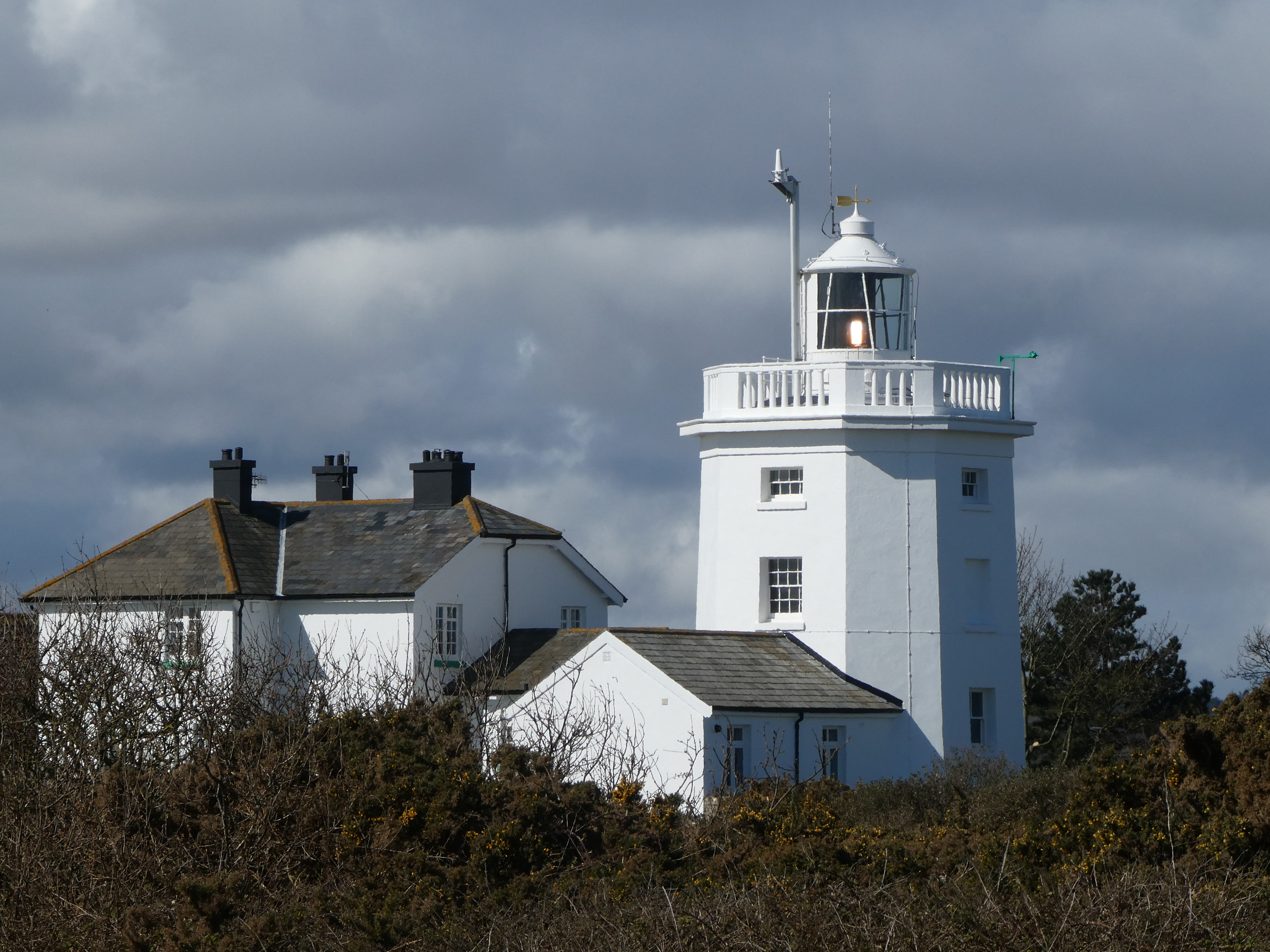
The present lighthouse, with the light enabled.

In June 1990 the lighthouse was converted to automatic operation and is monitored from the Trinity House Operation Control Centre at Harwich in Essex.

As a consequence of automation the lighthouse keeper's cottage alongside the tower is now let out as holiday apartment although the property is still owned by Trinity House. The lighthouse tower is not open to the public but the area around the lighthouse is easily accessible.

=== LED installation ===
In January 2025 the lighthouse was again upgraded: the revolving 3rd order catadioptric drum optic and its associated lamp were removed, and replaced with a flashing LED module (which simulates the former characteristic).

== See also ==
- List of lighthouses in England
