= Lowestoft Lighthouse =

Lighthouse in Lowestoft, England

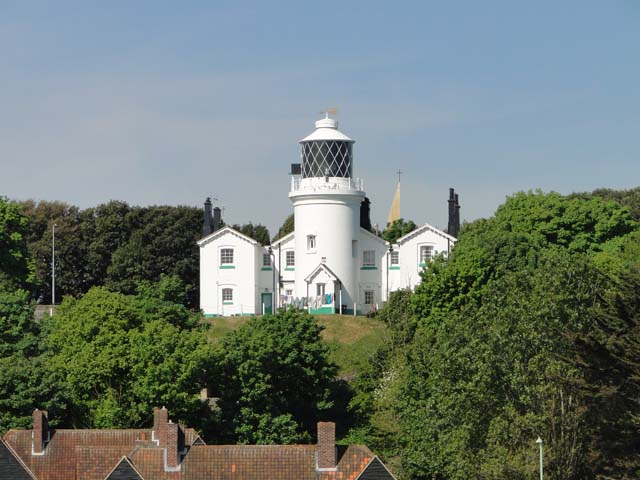
- Lowestoft Lighthouse
- Location: Lowestoft, Suffolk
- OS grid: TM5508894308
- Coordinates: 52°29′13.2″N 1°45′21.4″E

Tower
- Constructed: 1609 (first); 1628 (second); 1676 (third)
- Construction: Brick tower
- Automated: 1975
- Height: 16 m (52 ft)
- Shape: Cylindrical tower with balcony and lantern
- Markings: White tower and lantern
- Operator: Trinity House
- Heritage: Grade II listed building

Light
- First lit: 1874 (current)
- Focal height: 37 m (121 ft)
- Lens: 4th order 250mm twin spectacle catadioptric
- Intensity: 380,000 candela
- Range: 23 nmi (43 km)
- Characteristic: White rotating – flashing once every 15 seconds

Lowestoft Lighthouse is a lighthouse operated by Trinity House located to the north of the centre of Lowestoft in the English county of Suffolk. It stands on the North Sea coast close to Ness Point, the most easterly point in the United Kingdom. It acts as a warning light for shipping passing along the east coast and is the most easterly lighthouse in the UK.

The original lighthouses at Lowestoft, which were established in 1609, were the first lights to be built by Trinity House. They marked the southern approach to Yarmouth Roads which, in the seventeenth century, was a key roadstead and anchorage, in frequent use both by vessels engaged in the local herring trade and by colliers on the route from Newcastle to London.

The current lighthouse was built in 1874 and stands 16 metres (52 ft) tall, 37 metres (121 ft) above sea level. The light, which has a range of 23 nautical miles (43 km; 26 mi), was automated in 1975.

== History ==
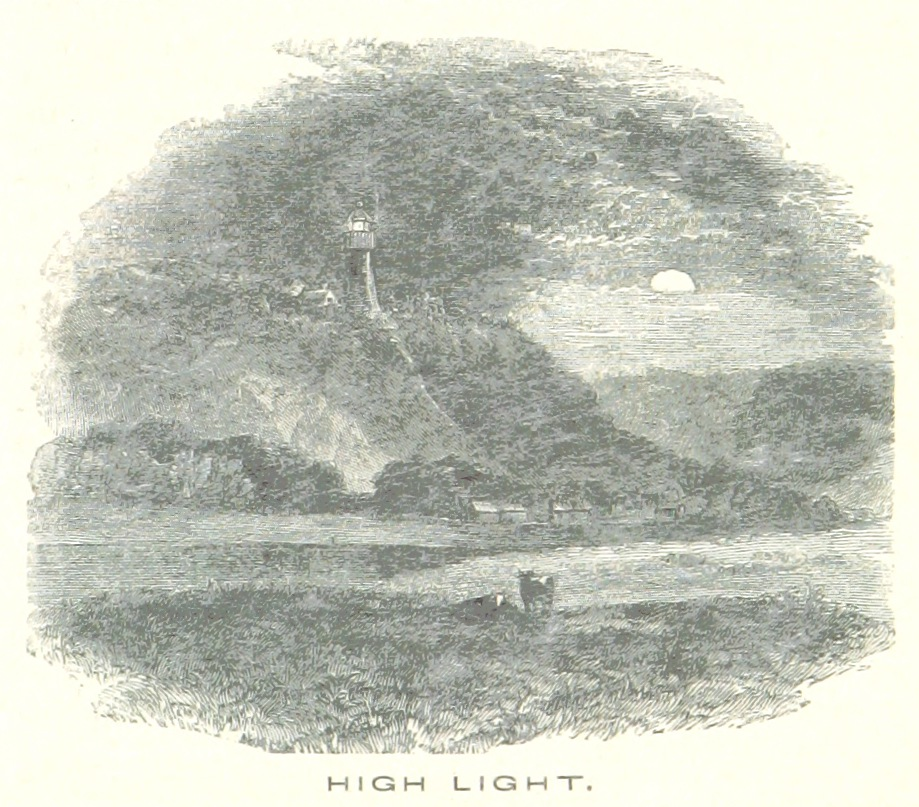
The old High Light in 1851.

=== 17th century ===
The first two lighthouses in Lowestoft were built in 1609, on the foreshore warn shipping of dangerous sandbanks around the coast. Both were lit originally by candles. By lining up the two lights, vessels could navigate the Stamford Channel which no longer exists. They were rebuilt in 1628 and again in 1676. It was at this time that one light was moved up onto the cliffs above the Denes – the location of the present lighthouse – to assist vessels further out to sea; this new 'High Light' was lit using a coal fire brazier.

=== 18th century ===
The remaining 'Low Light' was discontinued in 1706 following sea encroachment, but then re-established in 1730 as a wooden tower that could be easily moved in response to further changes to the Stamford Channel and shoreline. It was lit with three candles which showed through a sash window in the upper storey. Rebuilt again in 1779, it was equipped with an open-cupped oil lamp which burned sperm oil.

In 1777 the brazier in the High Light was replaced with an innovative form of reflector known as a 'spangle light': 126 lamp wicks (fed from an oil cistern by a common fuel line) were set in a circle around a central column on which were glued 4,000 tiny mirrors; it was said to be visible some 20 nautical miles (37 km; 23 mi) out to sea.

In 1796 improvements were made to both towers and they were each provided with Argand lamps and parabolic reflectors.

=== 19th century ===
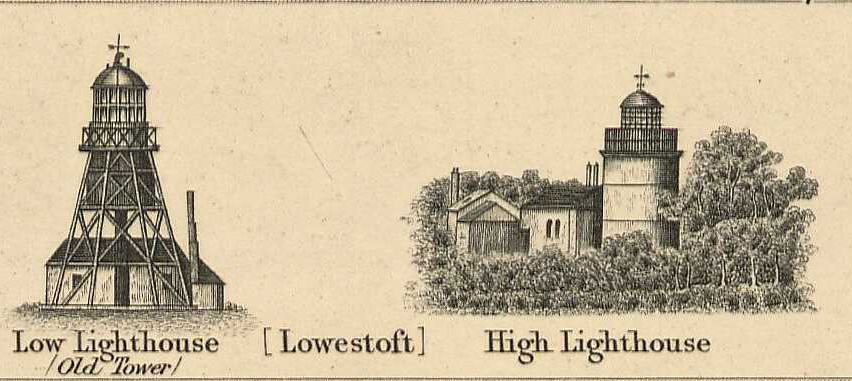
The Low and High Lighthouses (as they were in the mid-19th century).

==== Low Light changes ====
In 1832 the position of the Low Light was moved from the Denes to the beach. At the same time it was rebuilt as 'a lantern on a framing of timber upon a brick foundation'. The structure was painted white and a wooden dwelling was built alongside for the keeper. It was also known as the 'Beach Lighthouse'.

In the mid-19th century both towers still had Argand lamps and reflectors (eleven of each in the High Light, three in the Low Light); they both displayed a fixed white light.

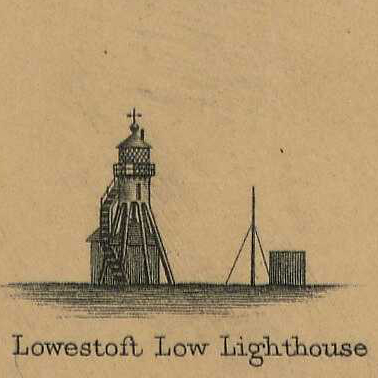
The new Low Lighthouse of 1866.

In 1866 the Low Light was again moved and rebuilt (to a design by James Douglass), this time as a wrought iron structure. It was placed on the point of Lowestoft Ness, 515 yards (471 m) from the previous Low Light (the position of the Stamford Channel having altered). Accommodation for two keepers was provided in a 'neat white brick building' alongside. The new Low Light (also known as Lowestoftness Lighthouse) was lit by a three-wick oil burner set within a second-order fixed catadioptric optic designed by James Timmins Chance, which gave a visible range of 11 nautical miles (20 km; 13 mi). It was first lit on 15 January 1867 and shone red out to sea but with two white sectors indicating the safe inshore water (or Roads) to the north and the south. A fog bell was also provided, which sounded three times every fifteen seconds; it was rung by clockwork. In 1874 the light was converted to run on mineral oil, which was stored in four 220-gallon tanks installed at the base of the tower.

In 1881, the Low Light was again improved and showed an occulting light (being eclipsed for three seconds every thirty seconds). In 1883, due to the encroaching sea, the lighthouse was moved inland.

In 1894 a reed fog horn had been installed; it sounded a seven-second blast every half minute during foggy weather. It was housed in a wooden building on ground level, beneath the light, along with a pair of two-horsepower Tangye gas engines to provide compressed air. The fog bell continued in use, but only to cover the interval between the appearance of fog and the fog horn commencing to sound.

The Low Light was again moved to a new position (250 ft (76 m) further inland) in 1899, the sea having further encroached on the Ness. At the same time it was converted to run on coal gas, a cluster of seven Welsbach mantle burners being installed within the optic. The burners were switched on and off by clockwork, to preserve the occulting characteristic (the gas being cut off for three seconds every half-minute). The red and white sectors had a range of 13 and 14.5 nautical miles respectively.

==== High Light changes ====
The High Lighthouse was repaired and improved in 1825, and also in 1840 (when a pair of houses were built alongside for the keepers). In 1866 the venerable lighthouse was described as a round tower, forty feet high and twenty feet in diameter, built of brick and stone, surmounted by a lantern seven feet high and six feet in diameter, glazed with plate glass.

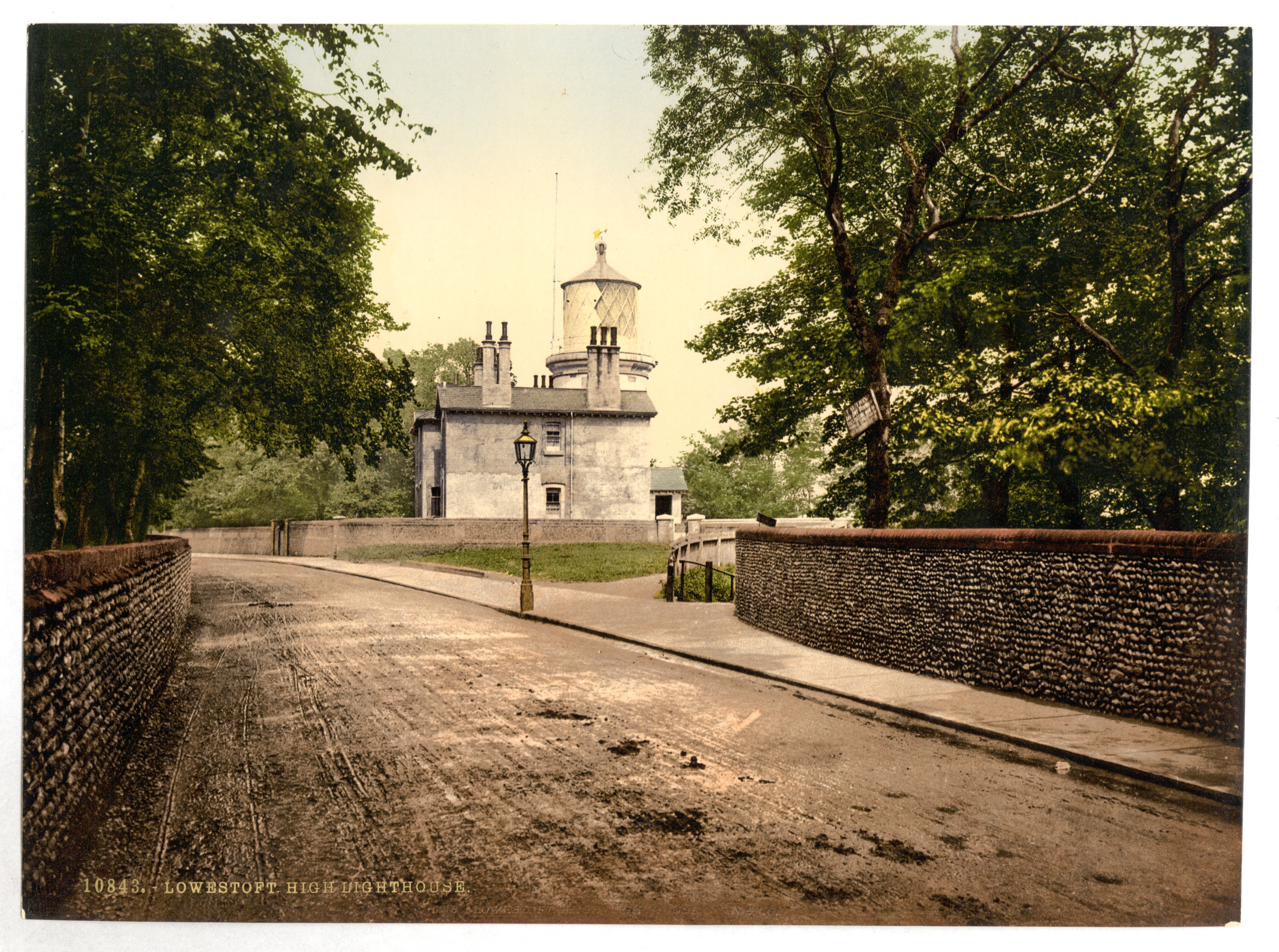
The new High Light, c. 1890

In 1870 the decision was taken to electrify the High Light, and because the tower itself was deemed not to be strong enough to support the new arc lamp and other equipment it had to be rebuilt. The new tower (the present lighthouse) was completed in 1874; however, due to the successful development of paraffin oil as an efficient and economical illuminant in the meantime, the new tower was equipped with a Douglass 4-wick paraffin burner instead. The new High Light was provided with a revolving first-order dioptric optic manufactured by Chance & co., an 'octagonal drum of lenses' which flashed white every thirty seconds. A fixed red light was also displayed, from a window lower down in the tower, towards Corton Sands to the north-east.

=== 20th–21st century ===
In 1901 the High Lighthouse was fitted with a Kitson oil vapour burner, which increased the intensity of the beam from 63,000 to 241,000 candlepower. This was the first installation of an incandescent petroleum vapour burner in an English lighthouse; the initial trial proved successful and subsequently (after modifications were made to the design by Sir Thomas Matthews) they were fitted by Trinity House in all its oil-lit lighthouses.

The Low Light was discontinued in August 1923, the Stanford Channel no longer being navigable.

In 1938 the High Light was connected to mains electricity; electric filament lamps were installed and placed within a new fourth-order 'twin' optic made up of four dioptric panels (arranged as two side-by-side pairs, placed back to back). The optic was mounted on a mercury float pedestal and rotated by a weight-driven clockwork. Each side of the optic was fitted with an automatic lamp changer, which would substitute a battery voltage lamp for the mains voltage lamp in the event of a power failure; Planté batteries were installed and trickle-charged from the mains, to provide the emergency power.

The light was automated in 1975 and further modernised in 1997, since when it has been monitored and controlled from the Trinity House Planning Centre in Harwich.

The lighthouse, along with Southwold lighthouse to the south, was threatened with closure by Trinity House in 2005, with shipping companies increasingly using satellite navigation systems rather than relying on lighthouses. Both lighthouses were reprieved in 2009 following a review by Trinity House that found that satellite navigation systems were not yet sufficiently reliable.

== Current display ==
The main light at Lowestoft continues to use the twin 4th order 250mm catadioptric lenses with a range of 23 nautical miles (43 km; 26 mi). The current light characteristic is one white flash every 15 seconds (Fl(1).W.15s). The lighthouse, along with two cottages originally used by lighthouse keepers, is a Grade II listed building.

== See also ==
- List of lighthouses in England
