= Gloucester Harbour Trustees =

The Gloucester Harbour Trustees are the competent harbour authority (CHA) for the tidal part of the River Severn from the Gloucester weirs (Llanthony and Maisemore) down to seaward of the Second Severn Crossing, on the Welsh side of the Severn Estuary (north of Denny Island) from the Second Severn Crossing as far as Goldcliff, and on the River Wye up to its tidal limit (Bigsweir).

== History ==
Pilotage of vessels in the Bristol Channel and Severn Estuary was overseen by Bristol until 1861, when Cardiff, Newport and Gloucester took concerted action because of the increase in the trades using the ports of Cardiff, Newport and Gloucester and petitioned Parliament to press for the passing of the Bristol Channel Pilotage Act 1861. This gave the ports the independence they sought. Pilotage commissioners were constituted for these ports with powers to license pilots for the non-compulsory pilotage of ships in the Bristol Channel and River Severn bound for these ports, each port having a defined area of jurisdiction. After a new dock was built in Sharpness in 1874 that was capable of handling larger vessels, the number of ships visiting the Gloucester docks declined and the custom house was moved to Sharpness. The Sharpness Lighthouse Authority was set up in 1888 to provide aids to navigation throughout the harbour area so that ships could enter the port both by day and night. The following year this became the Gloucester Harbour Authority which, as well as being responsible for lights in the estuary, were tasked with controlling navigation there. Gloucester Harbour Authority later evolved into the Gloucester Harbour Trustees, which later relocated to Sharpness; it is responsible for all pilotage in the estuary. The trustees also established moorings at Northwick Oaze south of Aust and created a deeper channel so that larger vessels could reach Sharpness more easily.

== Responsibilities ==
The trustees have responsibilities for navigational safety in that part of the estuary, and maintain a number of navigation aids (beacons, buoys and lighthouses), and a special 'Pilotwatch Radar' with portable sets for use by pilots. They also arrange the provision of pilots which are compulsory for most commercial shipping and other vessels over 30m LOA in the GHT area. The main commercial traffic within the GHT area is to the port of Sharpness, and some sand dredging. The harbour, which has one of the world's highest tidal ranges, includes both the present road crossings and two riverside nuclear sites (one at Oldbury decommissioning, one at Berkeley decommissioning).

The trustees were originally constituted in 1890 and initially comprised some 22 trustees. Today the board consists of 10 members, who are appointed in line with the principles of the ‘Guide to Good Governance’ drawn up as part of the DETR’s Review of Trust Ports and in accordance with the provisions of the Gloucester Harbour Revision (Constitution) Order 2002 (which also sets out the boundaries of the Gloucester Harbour). The Gloucester Harbour Trustees, as competent harbour authority for this part of the river, have issued safety guidance for surfers, canoeists, small craft and river bank users in relation to the Severn bore, a phenomenon of the Severn Estuary and lower parts of the river under certain tidal conditions.

== The Gloucester Harbour Trustees area ==
The Gloucester Harbour Trustees area, especially above Sharpness, includes many areas of interest to environmentalists. These include extensive mud flats and grassland areas on which migrating and resident birds feed and include a number of Sites of Special Scientific Interest. The estuary experiences one of the biggest tidal ranges in the world and a Severn Barrage is often under discussion to harness the energy generated by the tide.
