= Dovercourt Lighthouses =

Defunct lighthouses near Harwich, Essex

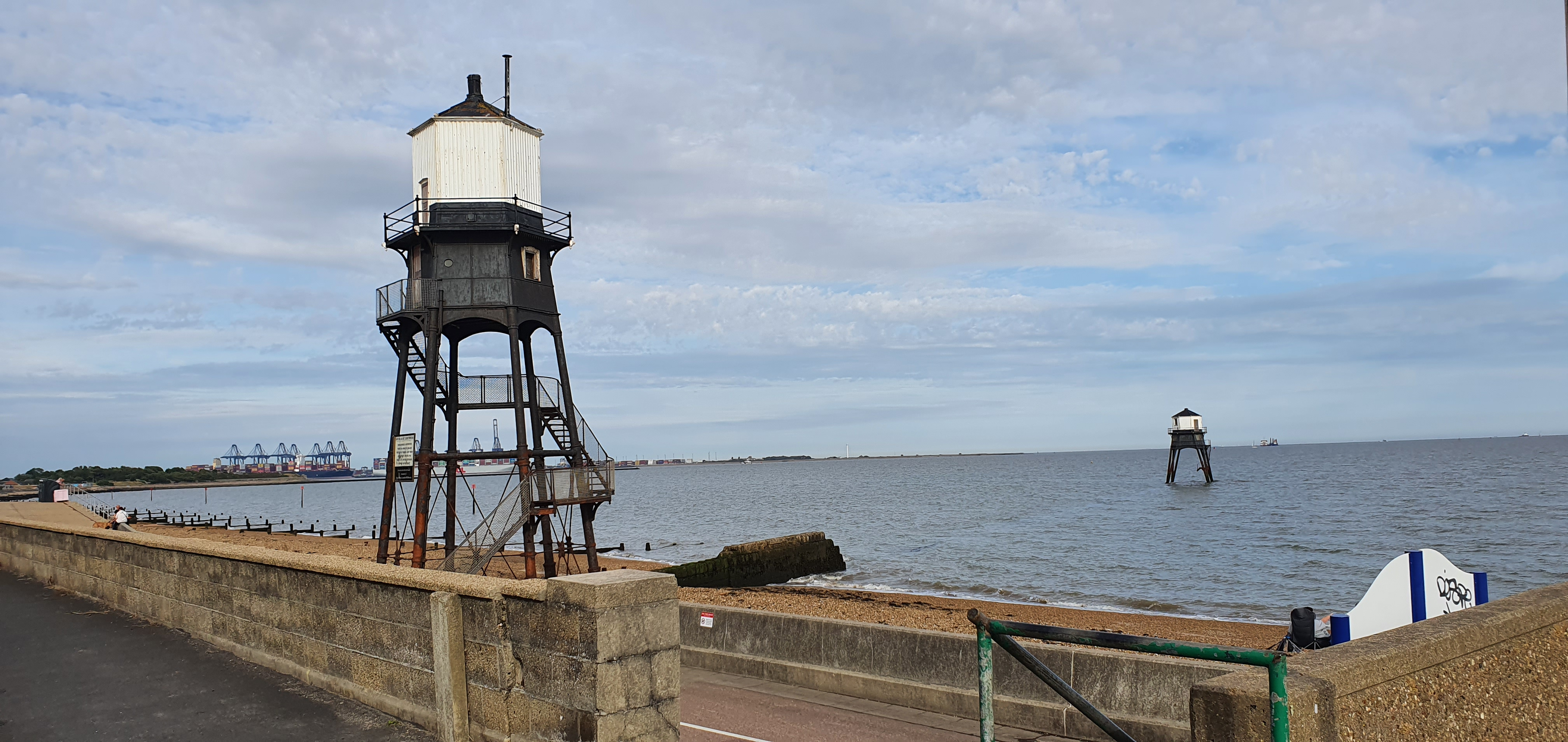
- The Dovercourt Lighthouses photographed in September 2022; the causeway is submerged at high tide
- Interactive map of the Dovercourt Lighthouses area

General information
- Status: At risk
- Location: Dovercourt, Essex, England, United Kingdom

The Dovercourt Lighthouses are a pair of 19th century lighthouses in Dovercourt, Essex, joined by a causeway. Built in the 1860s, the lighthouses operated through to 1917, when they were decommissioned. In 1975 they were designated as a scheduled monument, and in 2019 were added to the Heritage at Risk Register. They are the only pair of iron leading lights that are still standing in England.

== History ==
The Dovercourt Lighthouses were commissioned by Trinity House in 1862 to assist with guiding ships into the port at nearby Harwich; they served as a replacement for the Harwich High and Low Lighthouses, which had been made redundant by the shifting of sand bars in the Stour estuary. Construction was completed in 1863.

In 1917, the lighthouses became redundant after the construction of a single light on the Harwich breakwater and the introduction of a system of marker buoys. Harwich Town Council purchased the lighthouses in 1922. Significant restoration work was carried out in the 1980s after an appeal by the town's high steward.

In 2019, the lighthouses were added to the Heritage at Risk Register. A detailed survey was organised by Tendring District Council in 2025, which found that the iron structures were undergoing significant corrosion, and at risk of suffering "irreparable" damage within five years. The estimated cost of repairs is approximately £3 million; Tendring District Council has pledged £330,000 to the project.

== Design ==
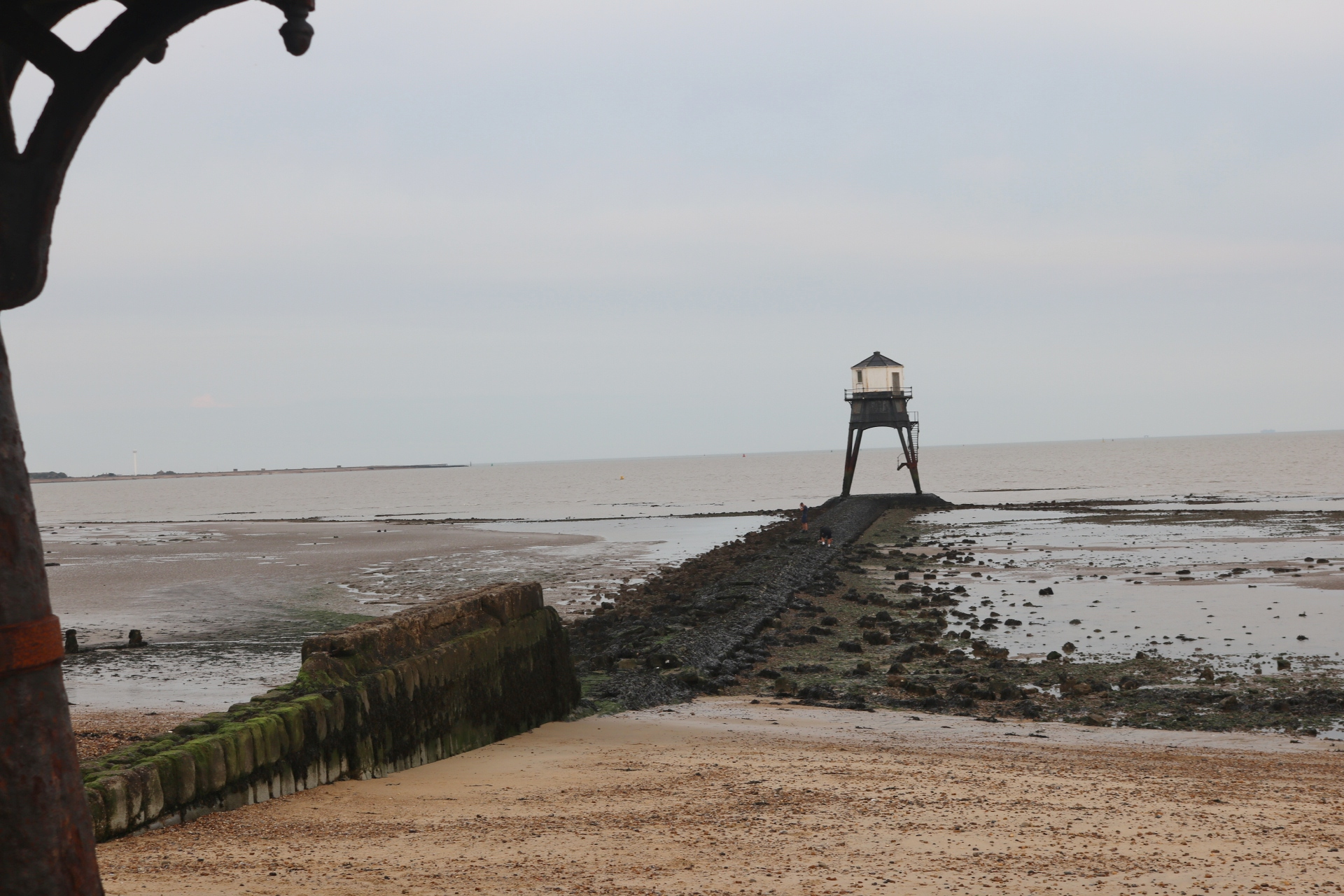
The Dovercourt Lighthouses in 2025; the tide is out, revealing the stone causeway

The Dovercourt Lighthouses are a pair of screw-pile lighthouses, of a kind invented by Alexander Mitchell. Their original gas lamps functioned as leading lights; the lights were visible at distances of 11 miles for the inner lighthouse, and 9 miles for the outer lighthouse. They are spaced approximately 200 metres apart, at either end of a stone causeway; the inner lighthouse is on the beach, while the outer lighthouse projects into Dovercourt Bay. The causeway is submerged at most times, but uncovered at low tide.

The inner lighthouse rises to a height of 15 metres, and is supported on six legs in a hexagonal pattern. The lighthouse structure itself is divided into two floors: the lightkeeper's chamber on the lower floor, and the lamp room above. The outer lighthouse is shorter, at around 11 metres tall, and supported on eight legs in an octagonal pattern; the lighthouse structure itself is of a similar design.
