= Peninnis Lighthouse =

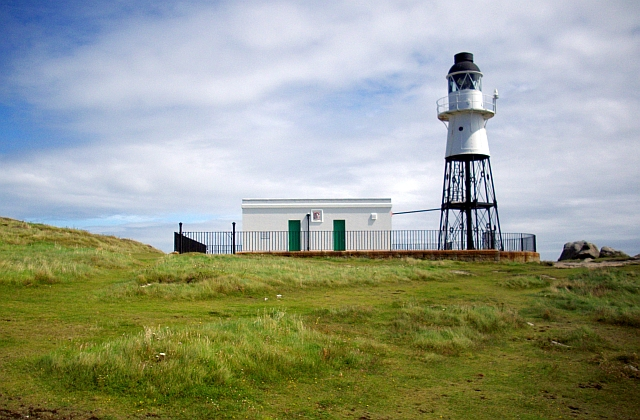
- Location: St Mary's; Isles of Scilly; England
- OS grid: SV9110509372
- Coordinates: 49.904624°N 6.303531°W

Tower
- Constructed: 1911
- Construction: metal tower
- Height: 14 metres (46 ft)
- Shape: circular skeletal tower lower half, closed tower upper half with balcony and lantern
- Markings: black lower part, white upper part
- Operator: Trinity House
- Heritage: Grade II listed building

Light
- Focal height: 36 metres (118 ft)
- Lens: 3rd order 500 millimetres (20 in) rotating
- Intensity: 1,080 candela
- Range: 9 nautical miles (17 km; 10 mi)
- Characteristic: Fl W 20s.

Listed Building – Grade II
- Official name: Peninnis Head Lighthouse
- Designated: 14 December 1992
- Reference no.: 1328857

Peninnis Lighthouse is situated on Peninnis Head, St Mary's, Isles of Scilly.

== History ==
The light was built to replace the lighthouse in the centre of the island of St Agnes and helps vessels to enter Hugh Town harbour, via St Mary's Sound. It was first lit in 1911, is circular, 45 feet (14 m) tall and consists of a black steel open lattice foundation, white gallery and black–domed top.

Initially, the lamp used was an incandescent burner which was powered by oil gas; the fuel was kept on site in four pressurised tanks (with a total capacity of 700 cubic feet), which the local Trinity House vessel would keep replenished. It was classed as a 'semi-watched' light (i.e. it did not require the full-time attendance of a keeper). The rotating third-order optic was driven by clockwork; it displayed a white flash every 20 seconds and its beam had a range of 16 nautical miles (30 km; 18 mi).

In 1922 the lighthouse was converted to automatic acetylene operation. (Acetylene was used to drive the rotating optic as well as fuelling the lamp). It was converted to electricity in 1992.

In late 2011, the year of its centenary, the lighthouse was updated, and at the same time downgraded (its visible range being reduced from 17 to 9 nautical miles (17 km; 10 mi) in accordance with the Trinity House 2010 Aids to Navigation review). A single-tier LED lantern, mounted on the exterior rail of the structure, now provides the light; within the lantern the old revolving lens still remains in situ, but it is no longer in use.

== See also ==
- List of lighthouses in England
