= Heugh Lighthouse =

Lighthouse in County Durham, England

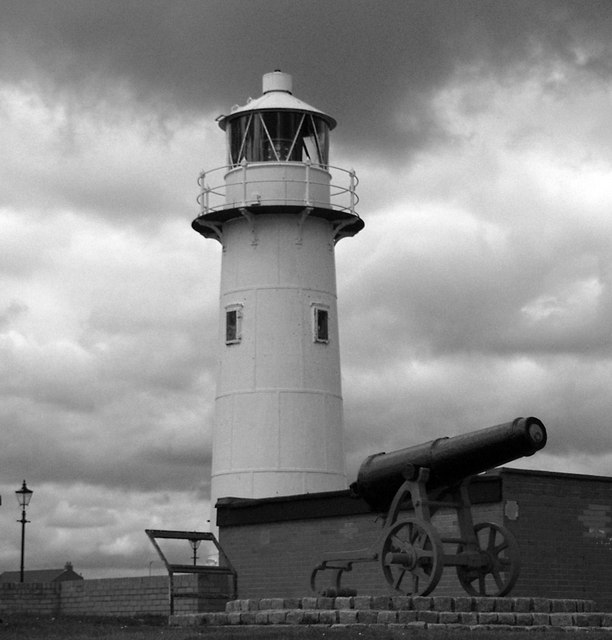
- The lighthouse in 2007
- Location: Hartlepool; County Durham; England
- Coordinates: 54°41′47.4″N 1°10′34″W

Tower
- Constructed: 1847 (first)
- Construction: steel tower (current) sandstone tower (first)
- Automated: 1927
- Height: 16.5 metres (54 ft) (current); 14.5 metres (48 ft) (first)
- Shape: cylindrical tower with balcony and lantern
- Markings: white tower and lantern
- Operator: PD Teesport

Light
- First lit: 1927 (current)
- Focal height: 19 metres (62 ft)
- Range: 19 nmi (35 km; 22 mi)
- Characteristic: Fl (2) W 10s.

The Heugh Lighthouse is a navigation light on The Headland in Hartlepool, in north-east England. The current lighthouse dates from 1927; it is owned and operated by PD Ports. It is claimed that its early-Victorian predecessor was the first lighthouse in the world reliably lit by gas.

== History ==
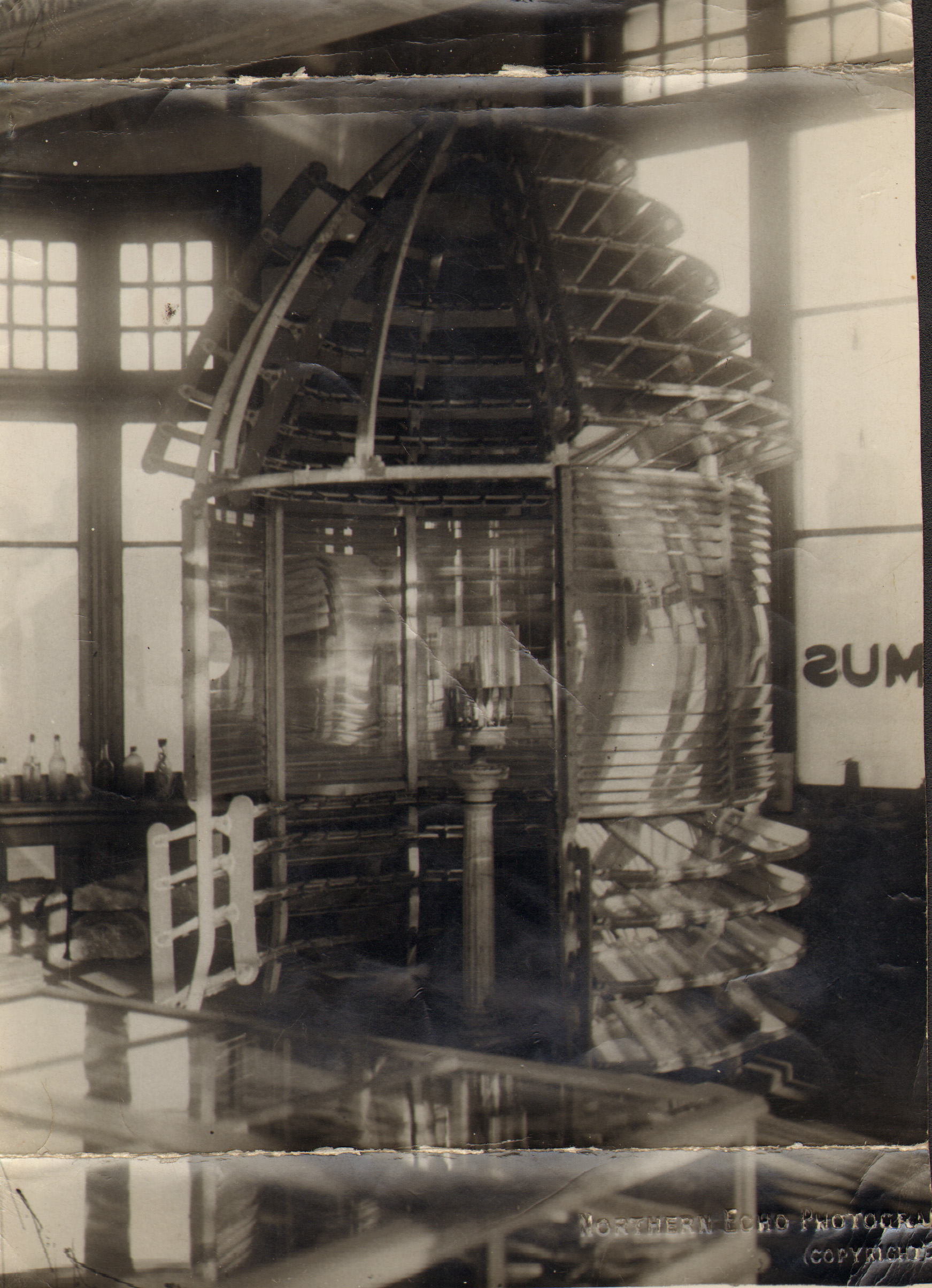
The former lamp and optic (in the Maritime Museum): a large fresnel lens with angled mirrors above and below.

Following the establishment of the Hartlepool Dock and Railway Company, West Hartlepool quickly grew into a sizeable coal port on the Durham coast. In 1844, mariners tasked with navigating their way into the new docks had expressed concern about the inadequate provision of lights on this dangerous stretch of rocky coastline, and in 1846 the Corporation of Trinity House instructed the harbour authority to make necessary provision.

=== 1847–1915: the first light on The Heugh ===
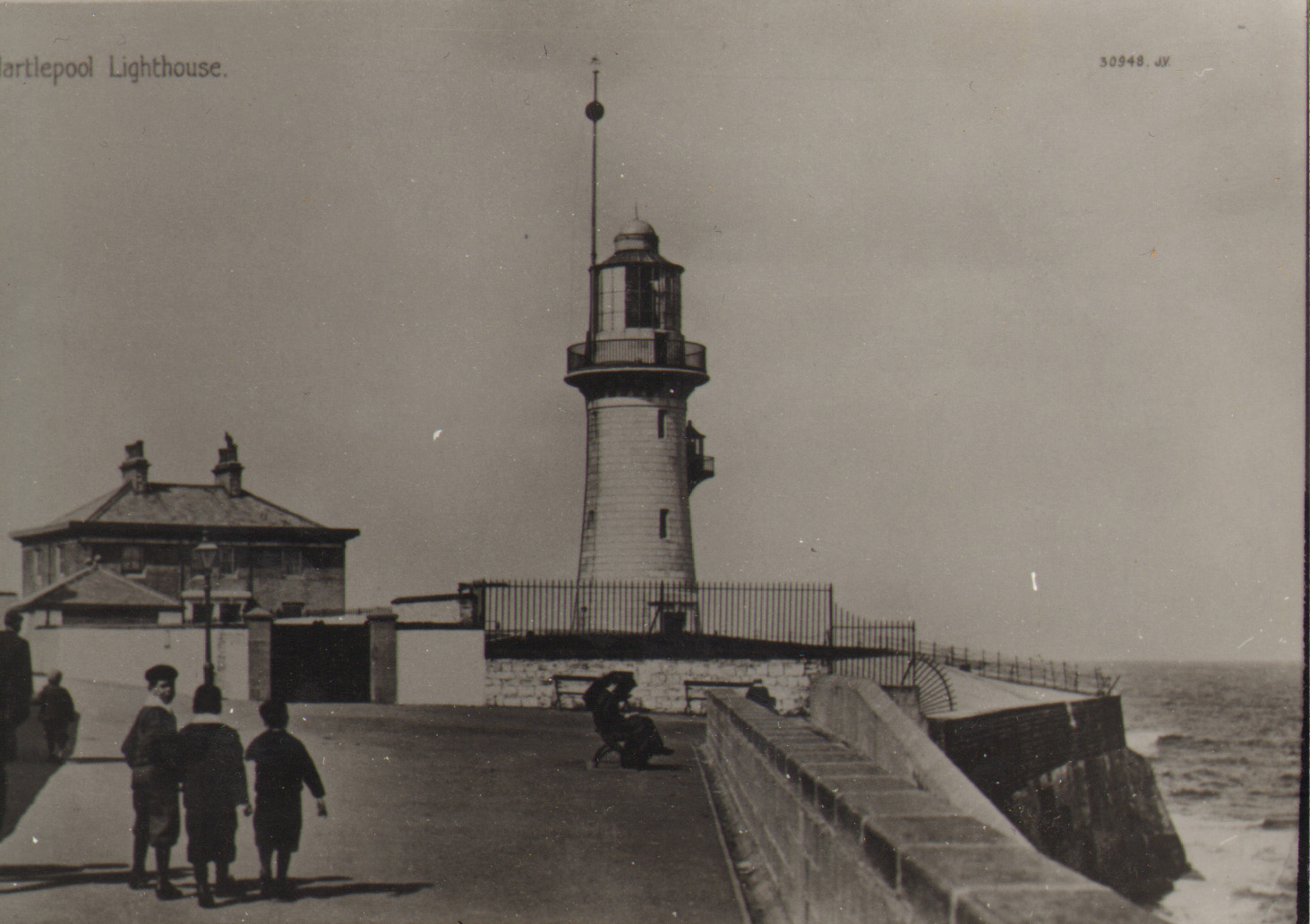
The old lighthouse on the Heugh.

A lighthouse was promptly built in sandstone, at a cost of £3,200: a tapering cylindrical tower 73 ft (22 m) high. It was first lit on 1 October 1847, fuelled by natural gas from one of the local coal mines. The lens (a first-order fixed catadioptric optic) was the last to be manufactured by the pioneering Newcastle firm of Cookson & Co., following its takeover by Robert W. Swinburne. The main light was visible for 18 miles out to sea. A subsidiary (red) light was shown from a window lower down on the tower 'from half flood to half ebb' to signal the state of the tide (during the day a red spherical day mark was displayed in place of the red light).

In December 1895 the characteristic of the main light was changed from fixed to occulting (going dark for one second every five seconds).

The old light's demise came about as an indirect result of the German raid on Hartlepool in December 1914. The lighthouse itself was unscathed (though several nearby buildings received severe damage), but it was realised that the tower obstructed the line of fire of the defensive guns of the Headland batteries. It was therefore dismantled in 1915.

=== 1915–1927: temporary light on the Town Moor ===
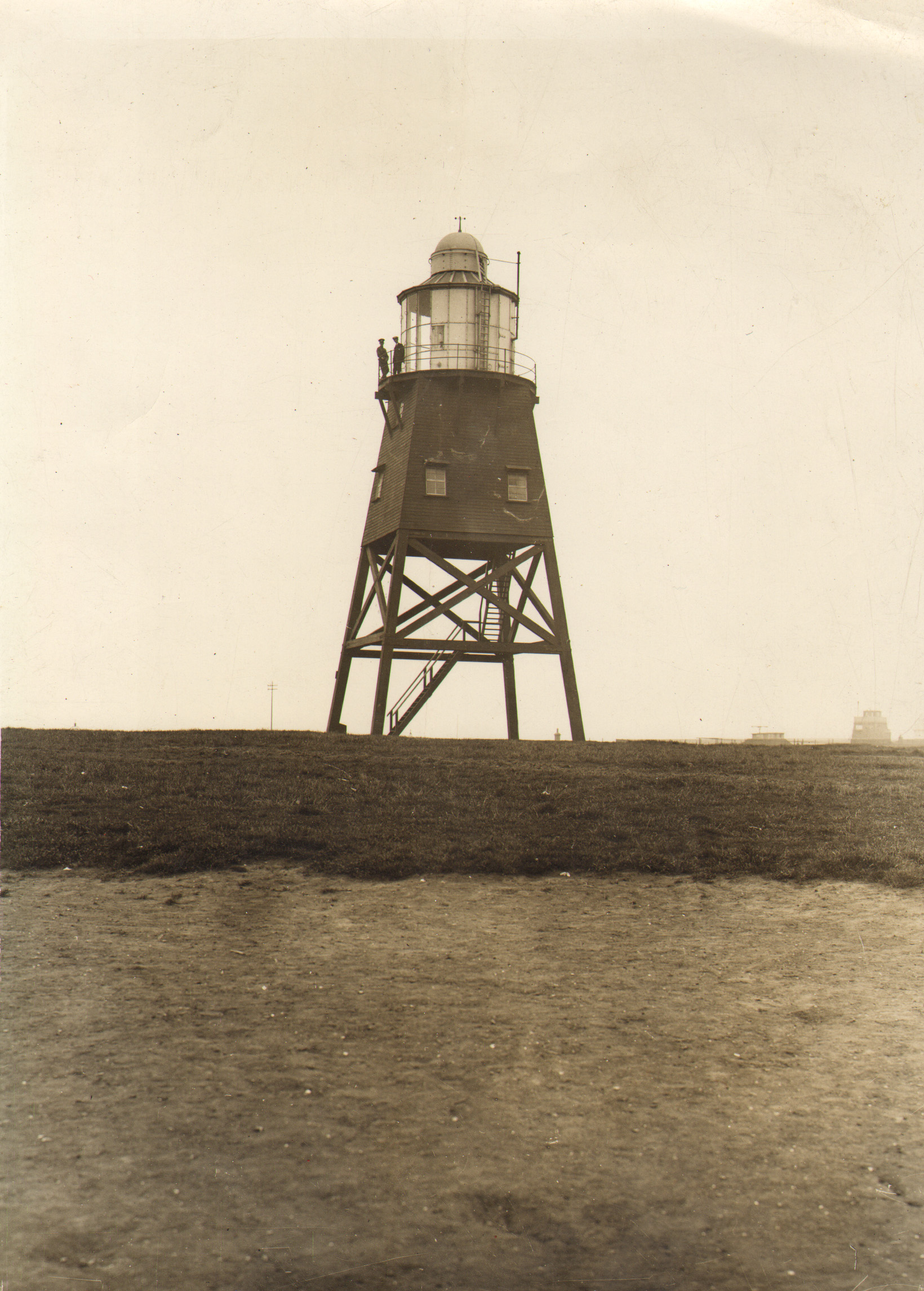
The temporary light on the Town Moor (1915–1927)

As a temporary measure, the light, lantern and lens from the Heugh Lighthouse were instead mounted on a wooden lattice structure on the nearby town moor. They remained here until the erection of the new Heugh light in 1927. When the structure was dismantled, the optic (lenses) and light array were saved; they are now on display in the Museum of Hartlepool.

=== 1927 onwards: the current lighthouse ===
The current lighthouse, of a prefabricated steel construction, is a white-painted cylindrical tower, 54 ft (16 m) high. Built not far from the site of the first lighthouse (though without obstructing the line of fire of the guns) it was designed to be able to be dismantled in the event of war, so as not to provide a landmark for enemy gunsights. It was, from the start, electrically-powered and fully automated: the light was switched on and off at sunset and sunrise automatically, by a patent sun valve; mains electricity was used, but as a backup a petrol generator was provided which was automatically engaged in the event of a power failure; and in the event of the bulb failing an automatic lamp changer would bring a spare bulb into operation (this change being signalled by a warning light mounted on the shore side of the lighthouse). The light displayed two white flashes every ten seconds.

== Present-day operation ==
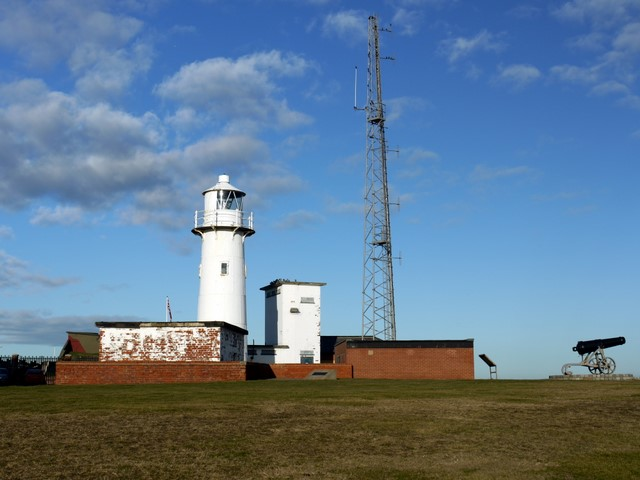
The lighthouse in its compound

The lighthouse is still in use today, under the management of the local port authority. It displays a white light, flashing twice every ten seconds. One of the adjacent buildings housed a nautophone fog signal, which used to sound three 3-second blasts every 45 seconds. The other building houses radio equipment for HM Coastguard.

== Other nearby lighthouses ==
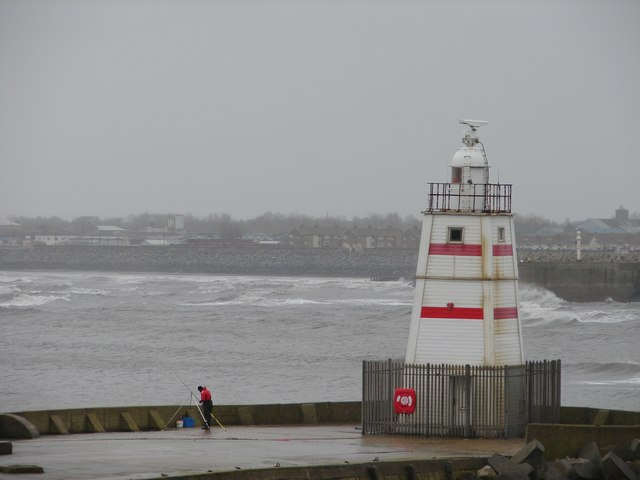
The Old Pier, Hartlepool Headland

Nearby Seaton Carew had a pair of lighthouses for many years. They were decommissioned in the late nineteenth century; years later one of the two was re-erected in Hartlepool Marina as a mariners' memorial.

South Gare Lighthouse stands on a pierhead at the opposite end of the bay to the Heugh, marking the southern approach to the River Tees.

Just south-west of the Heugh, the Old or 'Pilot' Pier has been marked by a lighthouse since 1836. The present wooden structure (painted white with two narrow red horizontal stripes) dates from 1899; the lantern is strikingly topped by a rotating radar. It displays a green light (one flash every three seconds) with a white sector indicating the deep-water channel into the Old Harbour and Hartlepool Docks.

== See also ==
- List of lighthouses in England
