= South Gare Lighthouse =

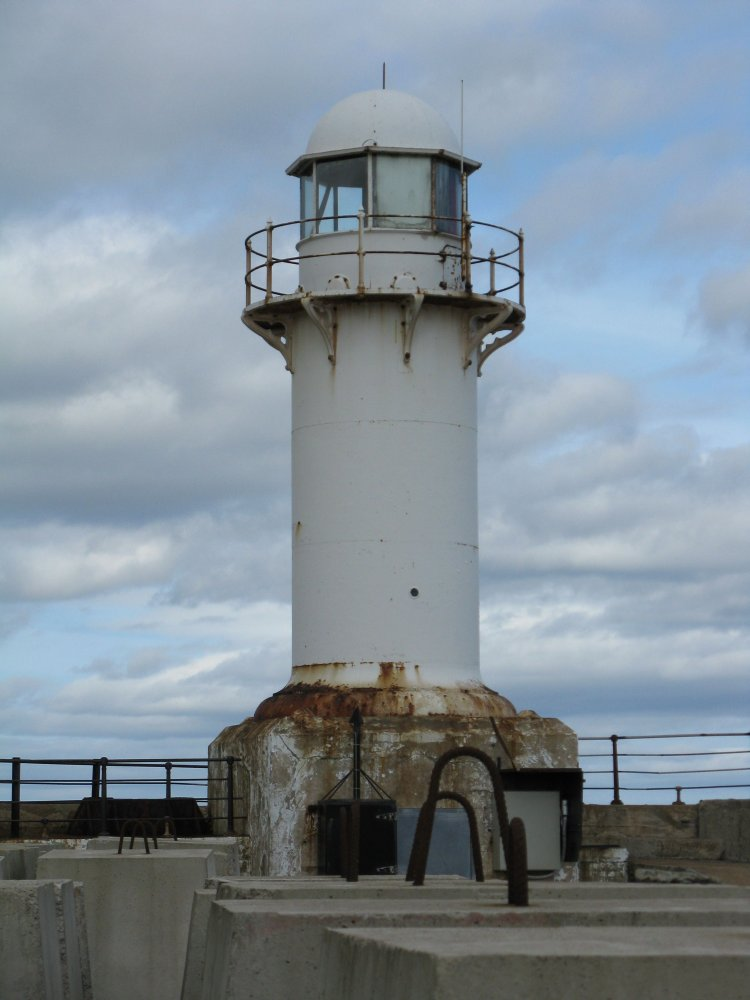
- Location: South Gare, Redcar and Cleveland, United Kingdom
- OS grid: NZ5575628374
- Coordinates: 54°38′51″N 1°08′15″W

Tower
- Constructed: 1884
- Foundation: concrete
- Construction: cast iron clad stone tower
- Height: 13 m (43 ft)
- Shape: cylindrical tower with balcony and lantern
- Markings: White (tower), white (lantern)
- Operator: PD Ports
- Heritage: Grade II listed building
- Fog signal: removed
- Racon: G0SBN/P

Light
- Focal height: 16 m (52 ft)
- Lens: 4th order 12 panel glass prismatic
- Light source: 45 Watt high intensity LED
- Intensity: 150,000 candela
- Range: 20 nmi (37 km; 23 mi) (white), 17 nmi (31 km; 20 mi) (red)
- Characteristic: Fl WR 12s

South Gare Lighthouse was built in 1884 at the end of the breakwater at South Gare north west of Redcar in North Yorkshire and in north eastern England.

== History ==
There already were two navigation light towers built in 1829 and operating in Durham county at Seaton Carew and another at Hartlepool to guide ships clear of Coatham Rocks off Redcar and then onto the Fairway Buoy outside the bar of the River Tees. The building of South Gare lighthouse was planned and supervised by John Fowler, engineer to the Tees Conservancy Commissioners. Both light systems were used until 1892 when use of the light towers at Seaton Carew was discontinued by the Tees Conservancy Commissioners.

The South Gare lighthouse light was originally lit by a paraffin wick lamp. and perhaps subsequently by a pressurised paraffin burner. This was removed in 1955, and in about 1980 the chimney and weather vane were removed. The paraffin lamp was replaced by a mains powered 500 Watt tungsten filament Incandescent light bulb with a backup bulb on the bulb changer that operated with a backup diesel generator. The light operated with a 1.5 s flash every 12 seconds. The lens rotation mechanism was originally powered by a clockwork motor but this was replaced by two electric motors, i.e. one duty motor and a backup motor. A fog signal was mounted to the west of the lighthouse but this has evidently been removed. The light source was a 35 Watt CDM-T lamp until 2007 when it was replaced by a 45 Watt high intensity LED lamp.

== Description ==
The lighthouse is 43 feet (13 m) high, with a cylindrical cast-iron-clad stone tower all painted white. Small porthole windows in the north and south sides of the column light an internal helical newel staircase.

The light source is held in the original eight-windowed lantern housing under a hemispherical copper-domed roof. Below the windows is a railed circular platform supported by brackets. The current light source is a 45 Watt high-intensity LED with a fourth-order prismatic lens and can be seen for a range of 20 miles (17 nmi). Set 53 feet (16 m) above mean high water the light operates automatically, exhibiting sectored red and white with a 0.5 s flash every 12 seconds with an effective intensity of 150,000 Candelas. The light is powered by a Schlunk 100 Watt water-cooled hydrogen fuel cell, a world first. This arrangement is more reliable than the mains electricity supply along the exposed breakwater because of its vulnerability in storms.

The lighthouse is a listed building and still operates using the original lenses. Today the lighthouse is owned and operated by PD Ports and has the Admiralty code A2626, NGA code 2020 and Amateur Radio Lighthouse Society (ARLHS) code ENG-131. The lighthouse can give status broadcasts using radio telemetry with the callsign G0SBN/P.

== See also ==
- List of lighthouses in England
- South Gare
