= 1st Durham Volunteer Artillery =

1st Durham Volunteer Artillery Durham Royal Garrison Artillery 511th & 526th (Durham) Coast Rgts, RA
- Active: 14 March 1860 – 31 October 1956
- Country: United Kingdom
- Branch: Territorial Army
- Role: Coastal Artillery; Siege Artillery; Heavy Anti-Aircraft Artillery
- Garrison/HQ: Hartlepool & West Hartlepool
- Engagements: Raid on Scarborough, Hartlepool and Whitby

Commanders
- Notable commanders: Lt-Col Lancelot Robson, DSO

The 1st Durham Volunteer Artillery was a unit of Britain's Volunteer Force and Territorial Army from 1860 to 1956. During World War I, it was the only coastal defence unit to engage the enemy, and it also trained siege gunners for service on the Western Front. It continued its coast defence role in World War II, after which it was converted into air defence and engineer units.

== Volunteer Force ==
An invasion scare in 1859 saw the creation of many Volunteer units composed of part-time soldiers eager to supplement the Regular British Army in time of need. Four Artillery Volunteer Corps (AVCs) were raised in County Durham, with their officers' commissions being issued on 14 March 1860:

- 1st Durham AVC at Durham with two batteries, later moved to Sunderland
- 2nd (Seaham) Durham AVC at Seaham
- 3rd Durham AVC at South Shields
- 4th Durham AVC at Hartlepool

The first Captain Commandant of the 1st Durham AVC at Sunderland was the local politician Sir Hedworth Williamson, Bt (1827–1900). He commanded it for 28 years and was appointed its Honorary Colonel in 1888 after command of the unit passed to Lt-Col Edwin Vaux.

The 2nd (Seaham) Corps was initially the largest of the four Durham AVCs, and the other three were attached to it for administrative purposes from August 1863. However, the attachment of the 1st Durham AVC was changed to the 1st Administrative Brigade of Northumberland Artillery Volunteers in November 1873. When that brigade was consolidated on 23 July 1880 to form the 1st Northumberland and Durham AVs (renamed the 1st Northumberland (Northumberland and Sunderland) from April 1882), the 1st Durham AVC provided Nos 13–15 Btys, later renumbered as Nos 7–9 Btys when another corps left the brigade.

The 1st Northumberland Brigade became part of the Northern Division of the Royal Artillery, on 1 April 1882. A reorganisation of the divisions on 1 July 1887 saw the 1st Durham AVC regain its independence, with HQ at Sunderland and eight batteries, attached to the Western Division, with the subtitle '(Western Division Royal Artillery)' added to its designation.

As well as manning fixed coast defence artillery, some of the early Artillery Volunteers manned semi-mobile 'position batteries' of smooth-bore field guns pulled by agricultural horses. But the War Office (WO) refused to pay for the upkeep of field guns for Volunteers and they had largely died out in the 1870s. In 1888, the 'position artillery' concept was revived and some Volunteer artillery companies were reorganised as position batteries to work alongside the Volunteer infantry brigades. The 1st Durham AVC was supplied by the WO with four obsolete 16-pounder rifled muzzleloading guns and two wagons, but without horse harness. The volunteers purchased a lot of condemned government harness and patched it up to make sets for their horse teams. Two of the unit's eight companies were amalgamated to man this battery. The battery was instructed to move at walking pace, but it covered 32 miles in one day to attend its first annual training at Newbiggin. In 1890 it came second in the National Artillery Association's Queen's Prize competition at Shoeburyness. On 14 July 1892, the 1st Durham Volunteer Artillery were reorganised as one position battery and six companies (seven companies by 1894). The HQ was in Sunderland, except No 6 Company at Southwick.

On 1 June 1899, all the Volunteer artillery units became part of the Royal Garrison Artillery (RGA) and with the abolition of the RA's divisional organisation on 1 January 1902, the unit became the 1st Durham RGA (Volunteers). On the outbreak of the Second Boer War in 1899 the position battery volunteered for service in South Africa, but the offer was declined, apparently because of its obsolete guns. 'Position batteries' were redesignated 'heavy batteries' in May 1902 and in 1906 the 16-pdrs were replaced by more modern 4.7-inch guns.

=== The Vaux connection ===
Edwin Vaux (1844–1908), who commanded the 1st Durham AVC from 1888, and was Hon Col from 1906, was a member of the prominent Vaux brewing family of Sunderland, and the family name frequently appears among the lists of Durham Volunteer Artillery officers. Among them was Major Ernest Vaux, who volunteered for the Imperial Yeomanry during the 2nd Boer War and commanded the Maxim gun detachment of the 5th Imperial Yeomanry, winning a Distinguished Service Order (DSO). The family brewery introduced Double Maxim brown ale in 1901 to celebrate the detachment's return and the beer is still brewed in Sunderland. Ernest Vaux later commanded the 7th Battalion, Durham Light Infantry (TF) (known as 'Vaux's Own') from 1911 and throughout World War I.

== Territorial Force ==
Under the Haldane Reforms, the Volunteer Force was subsumed into the new Territorial Force. In the original 1908 plans for the TF, the 1st Durham RGA was to combine with the Tynemouth Volunteer Artillery to form a Northumberland and Durham RGA (and spin off a battery and ammunition column for the local Royal Field Artillery (RFA) brigade), while the 4th Durham RGA in West Hartlepool was to combine with the 1st East Riding of Yorkshire RGA to form a Durham and Yorkshire RGA, the two new units covering the whole NE coast of England. These plans were radically changed, so that by 1910 the Tynemouth and East Riding elements had formed their own units, while the 1st and 4th Durham merged to form a new Durham RGA as a 'defended ports unit' (the 4th had also spun off a battery and ammunition column to the III Northumbrian Brigade RFA).

The organisation of the Durham RGA was as follows:

- HQ at The Armoury, West Hartlepool
- No 1 Heavy Battery at Sunderland
- Nos 2–4 Companies at West Hartlepool
- No 5 Company at Hartlepool

The companies were responsible for manning the batteries of fixed coastal guns of the Tees (4 × 6-inch guns, 2 × 4.7-inch guns) and at Hartlepool (3 × 6-inch), while the heavy battery was mobile and responsible for the landward defence of the batteries with its obsolescent 4.7-inch guns. The commanding officer was Lt-Col Lancelot Robson, a doctor and former mayor of Hartlepool, who had first been commissioned into the 4th Durham RGA in 1893.

== World War I ==
=== Mobilisation ===
World War I broke out on 4 August 1914 and the TF was mobilised. Immediately after mobilisation the heavy battery went to its war station at Cleadon, while the men of the coast batteries manned their guns. On the outbreak of war, TF units were invited to volunteer for Overseas Service and on 15 August 1914, the War Office (WO) issued instructions to separate those men who had signed up for Home Service only, and form these into reserve units. On 31 August, the formation of a reserve or 2nd Line unit was authorised for each 1st Line unit where 60 per cent or more of the men had volunteered for Overseas Service. The titles of these 2nd Line units would be the same as the original, but distinguished by a '2/' prefix. In this way, duplicate brigades, companies and batteries were created, mirroring those TF formations being sent overseas. The heavy battery began recruiting its 2nd Line in November 1914 and completed it within a week.

By the autumn of 1914, the campaign on the Western Front was bogging down into Trench warfare and there was an urgent need for batteries of heavy and siege artillery to be sent to France. The WO decided that the TF coastal gunners were well enough trained to take over many of the duties in the coastal defences, releasing Regular RGA gunners for service in the field, and 1st line TF RGA companies that had volunteered for overseas service had been authorised to increase their strength by 50 per cent. Although complete defended ports units never went overseas, they did supply trained gunners to RGA units serving overseas. They also provided cadres to form complete units for front line service. The Durham RGA is known to have provided half the personnel of 41st Siege Bty and then to have raised 142nd Heavy Bty and provided personnel to 94th and 149th Siege Btys in 1915–16.

=== Raid on Hartlepool ===
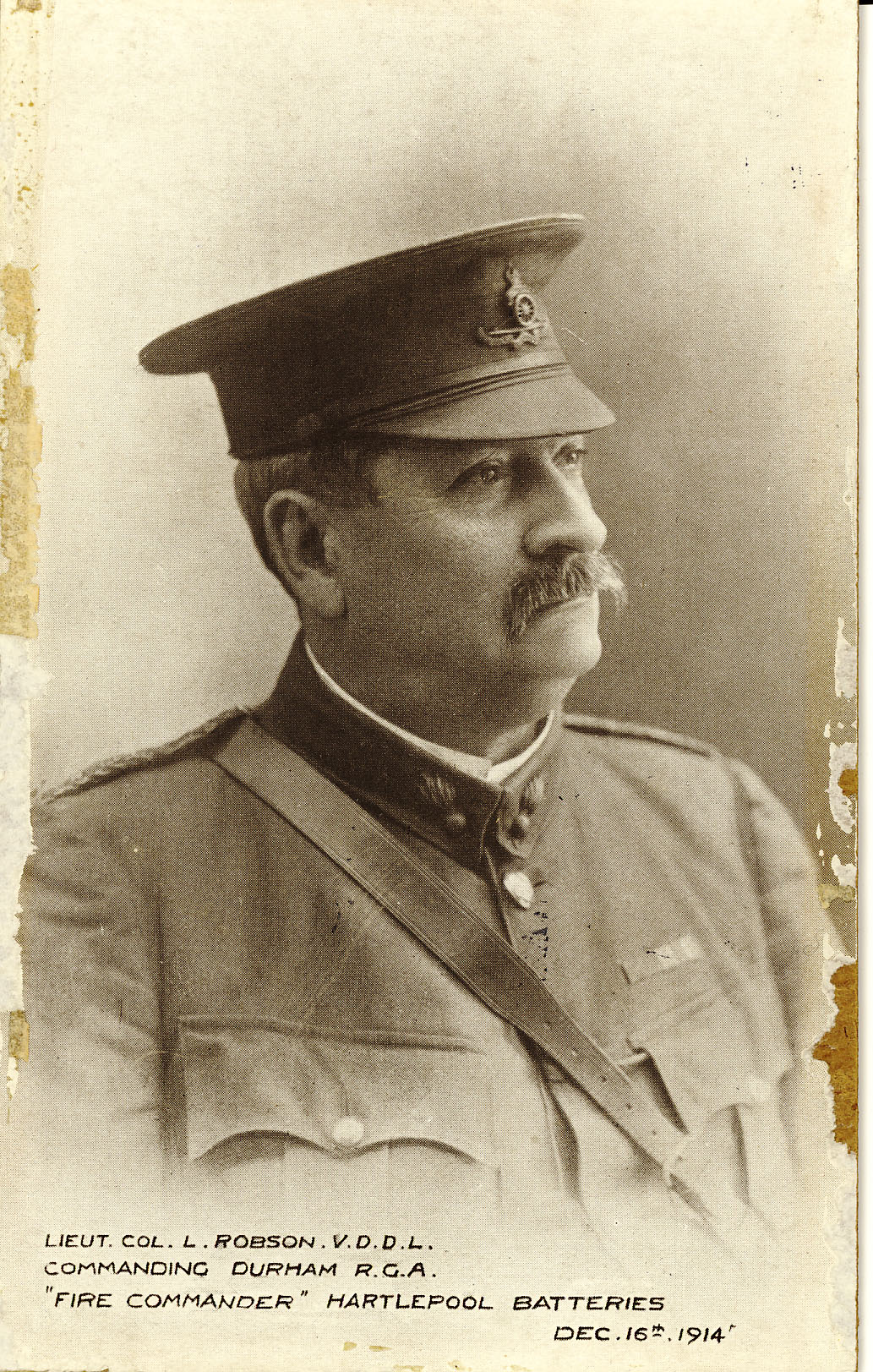
Photograph of Lt Col Lancelot Robson, VD, Commanding Durham RGA, Fire Commander, Hartlepool Batteries, on 16 December 1914 during the bombardment.

On the morning of 16 December 1914, a German naval force under Rear Admiral Franz von Hipper approached the coast of North East England to mount a Raid on Scarborough, Hartlepool and Whitby. The battle cruisers SMS Seydlitz and SMS Moltke, with the armoured cruiser SMS Blücher, concentrated on Hartlepool, which was a base for light Royal Navy warships. The port was defended by two batteries. On the day in question, 11 officers and 155 other ranks of the Durham RGA were manning Heugh Battery (two 6-inch guns manned by No 4 Company) and Lighthouse Battery (one 6-inch gun).

As was normal practice, the gunners 'stood to' at 06.30 and so were ready for action when the German warships approached. The Germans planned to bombard the batteries for 15 minutes to suppress them before turning the attention to the town. The Seydlitz opened fire at 08.10 and Lt-Col Robson rushed from his home to take up his post as Fire Commander and Battery Medical Officer at Heugh Battery. The first shell cut the Fire Commander's telephone lines, so the whole action was fought by the Battery Commanders on their own under standing orders. At ranges of 4000 to 5000 yards the German shells fell round the batteries without scoring a direct hit. Heugh Battery engaged first the Seydlitz and then the Moltke until they passed out of its arc of fire, and then concentrated on the stationary Blucher which was firing at Lighthouse Battery. Lighthouse Battery scored a direct hit on Blucher's forebridge, disabling two guns of the secondary armament, but suffered a number of misfires due to an electrical fault.

The action ended at 08.52 when the batteries fired their last rounds at 9200 yards' range at the withdrawing warships. The Germans had fired 1150 shells, killing 112 and wounding over 200 civilians and doing extensive damage to the town and docks. The Durham RGA suffered two killed, and in firing a total of 123 rounds had inflicted at least seven direct hits, killing eight German seamen and wounding four.

The bombardment of civilian targets caused great outrage among the British public at the time. The commanding officer and three gun captains of the Durham RGA were later decorated, Lt-Col Robson receiving a Distinguished Service Order, Sgt T. Douthwaite a Distinguished Conduct Medal for extracting a live cartridge from the breech of the Lighthouse Battery gun after a misfire, and Acting Bombardier J.J. Hope and Bombardier F.W. Mallin each received the Military Medal. These were the first two MMs to be gazetted after the institution of the award in April 1916. Hope's medal was the first MM minted, and the first to be presented. In 1920, all members of the Durham RGA in action that day were made eligible for the British War Medal, normally only awarded to those who saw active service overseas.

Late in 1914 the heavy battery's guns, horses, and 20 drivers were sent to Woolwich to supply units being prepared for overseas service, and the battery had to continue training without them. The guns had been replaced by April 1915 when the first attack was made on the North East coast by a German Zeppelin and they were fired at the raider, which went out to sea. (Note: This would have been the raid by Kapitänleutnant Heinrich Mathy with Zeppelin L 9 on the evening of 14 April.)

Although the unit never went overseas, the Durham RGA did supply trained gunners for RGA batteries and other units on active fronts (by 1916, for example, Sgt Douthwaite was with a siege battery and Bdr Mallin was a sergeant with an infantry battalion).

=== 41st Siege Battery ===
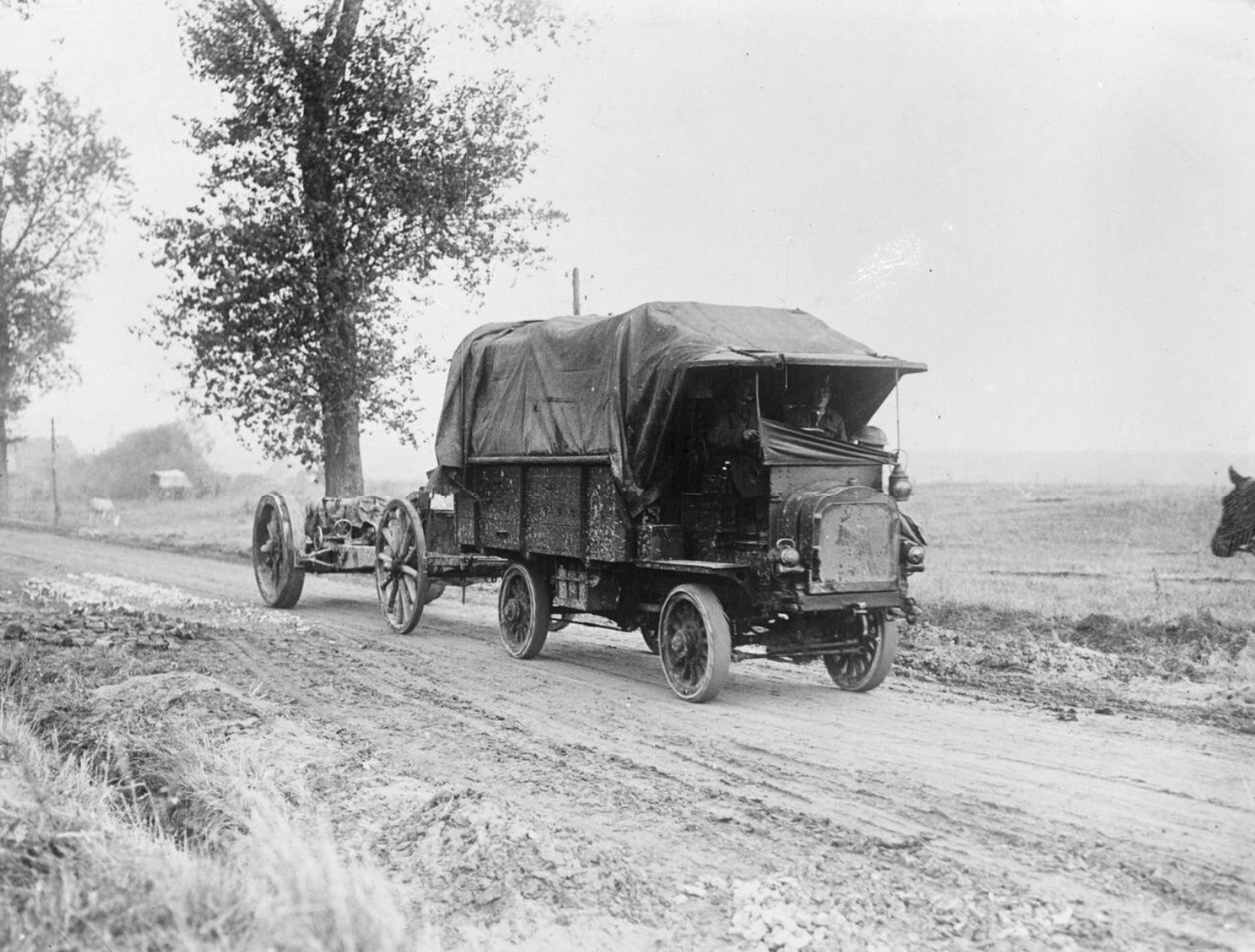
FWD Model B lorry towing a 6-inch 26 cwt howitzer. 41st Siege Bty was the first unit to be issued with this new gun.

41st Siege Battery was formed in Plymouth Garrison on 2 July 1915, half the strength being Regular details returned from the garrisons of Hong Kong and Singapore and half from Territorials of the Durham RGA. The battery formed part of 34th Brigade, RGA, and sailed with it to France on 9 December, equipped with four of the latest Vickers BL 6-inch 26 cwt howitzers. Capt O.L. Trechmann, previously commanding No 4 Company of the Durham RGA, was appointed second-in-command of the new battery, and took over its command in November 1916.

The battery spent the early months of 1916 with II Corps in the relatively quiet Armentières sector. RGA brigades were redesignated Heavy Artillery Groups (HAGs) in April 1916, and the policy now was to move batteries between them as required. 41st Siege Bty transferred in June to 25th HAG on the Somme where it fought throughout the whole Somme Offensive from July to November, sustaining heavy casualties from enemy shellfire in July.

During 1917, the battery supported the attacks at the Battle of Vimy Ridge, the Battle of Messines (when it sustained more heavy casualties) and the Third Battle of Ypres. In August, the battery was joined by a section from 416th Siege Bty, just arrived from the UK, but the additional guns to bring it up to a strength of six did not arrive until November. When HAGs were converted into permanent brigades in December 1917, 41st Siege Bty joined 23rd (9.2-inch Howitzer) Bde, of which the heaviest element (the 9.2-inch howitzers) were manned by 94th Siege Bty, also formed in part from the Durham RFA (see below). The brigade was part of XIX Corps in Fifth Army when the German Spring Offensive was launched on 21 March 1918. 41st Siege Bty's forward section of three guns was almost overrun as the German infantry broke through the line out of the mist, but the officer commanding, Maj Reginald Fillingham, was able to put the guns and ammunition out of action just in time. The remaining section fought throughout the 'Great Retreat' and supported the Australians at the First Battle of Villers-Bretonneux where they decisively stopped the German advance on that front.

41st Siege Bty was in action when the Allies launched their counter-offensive at the Battle of Amiens on 8 August, and then followed the advance of Fourth Army to the Hindenburg Line. It supported the Australian Corps and II US Corps during the successful Battle of the St Quentin Canal (29 September) and the following advance. It then fired in support of XII Corps in the set-piece battles of the Selle (17 October) and Sambre (4 November). After that, the pursuit was too fast for the 6-inch howitzers to keep up, and the battery was in billets when the Armistice with Germany came into force on 11 November.

Postwar, the battery briefly became 41st Battery, RGA, in the Regular Army, but was absorbed into another battery in January 1920.

=== 142nd (Durham) Heavy Battery ===
After 15 months' training in the Cleadon hills, the Durham RGA's heavy batteries had been sent to Woolwich, where they were equipped with modern 60-pounder guns and completed their training. 142nd (Durham) Heavy Battery was authorised on 31 October 1915 as a 4-gun battery formed from 1/1st and 2/1st Heavy Batteries. Under Maj J.L. Marr, who had commanded the Durham RGA's heavy battery since 11 September 1912, it was regarded as a TF unit not a 'New Army' (Kitchener's Army) like the other units formed by the Durham RGA. It embarked for the Western Front on 21 March 1916 and joined Second Army in the Ypres Salient. On 31 July, the battery transferred to Fifth Army fighting the Battle of the Somme, where the 60-pdr guns of the heavy batteries were called upon for counter-battery (CB) fire. On 5 October 1916, 142nd Heavy Bty was brought up to a strength of six guns when it was joined by a section from 176th Heavy Bty.

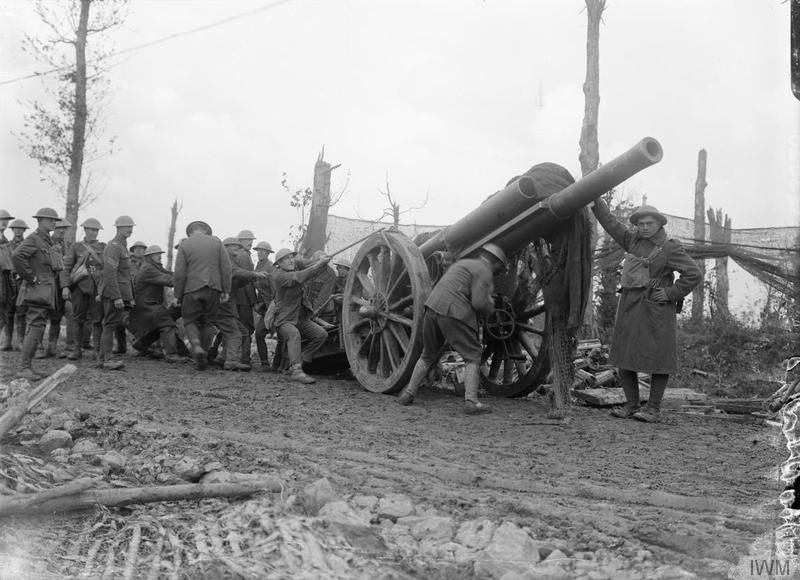
Moving a 60-pounder during the Third Ypres offensive, September 1917.

In April 1917, 142nd Heavy Bty supported the Canadian Corps' successful attack on Vimy Ridge as part of the Arras Offensive. Maximum use was made of observation balloons and aircraft to pinpoint opposing batteries for the heavies' CB fire. The battery rejoined Fifth Army on 1 September in time for the Battle of the Menin Road Ridge and subsequent battles of the Flanders Offensive. By the final Second Battle of Passchendaele, conditions for the British artillery were very bad: batteries were clearly observable and suffered badly from CB fire, while their own guns sank into the mud and became difficult to aim and fire.

Having been moved from one HAG to another, 142nd Heavy Bty joined 79th HAG on 18 December 1917, shortly before it became 79th Bde, remaining with it until the end of the war. 79th Brigade was with Second Army in April during the second phase of the German spring offensive, the Battle of the Lys. The heaviest guns were sent to the rear but the 60-pdrs remained with the field artillery firing in support of the hard-pressed infantry. On 28 June 79th Bde supported XI Corps in a limited counter-attack on La Becque, which was described as 'a model operation' for artillery cooperation.

79th Brigade joined Fourth Army on 18 August, soon after the beginning of the final Allied Hundred Days Offensive. It was among the mass of artillery supporting IX Corps' assault crossing of the St Quentin Canal on 29 September, and continued with it at the Battle of the Selle on 17 October, when one German counter-attack was broken up when all available guns were turned onto it. 79th Brigade was part of IX Corps' artillery reserve for the advance to the River Sambre on 23 October. As the regimental historian relates, 'The guns of Fourth Army demonstrated, on 23 October, the crushing effect of well co-ordinated massed artillery. they simply swept away the opposition'. IX Corps stormed across the canal on 4 November (the Battle of the Sambre), after which the campaign became a pursuit of a beaten enemy, in which the slow-moving heavy guns could play little part. The war ended with the Armistice with Germany on 11 November.

On return to the UK, the battery was disbanded at Sandling in Kent on 11 October 1919.

=== 94th Siege Battery ===
Formed on 16 December 1915 at Tynemouth under War Office Instruction No 181 of December 1915, which specified that it was to follow the establishment for New Army units, this battery had a cadre of three officers and 78 men from the Durham RGA; the rest of the men would be Regulars and New Army recruits from the Tynemouth Garrison. (Note: There are scattered references to this as '94th (Durham) Siege Bty', but the subtitle does not seem to have been officially recognised.) The Nominal Rolls of the battery show large numbers of men with home addresses in Hartlepool and the surrounding area.

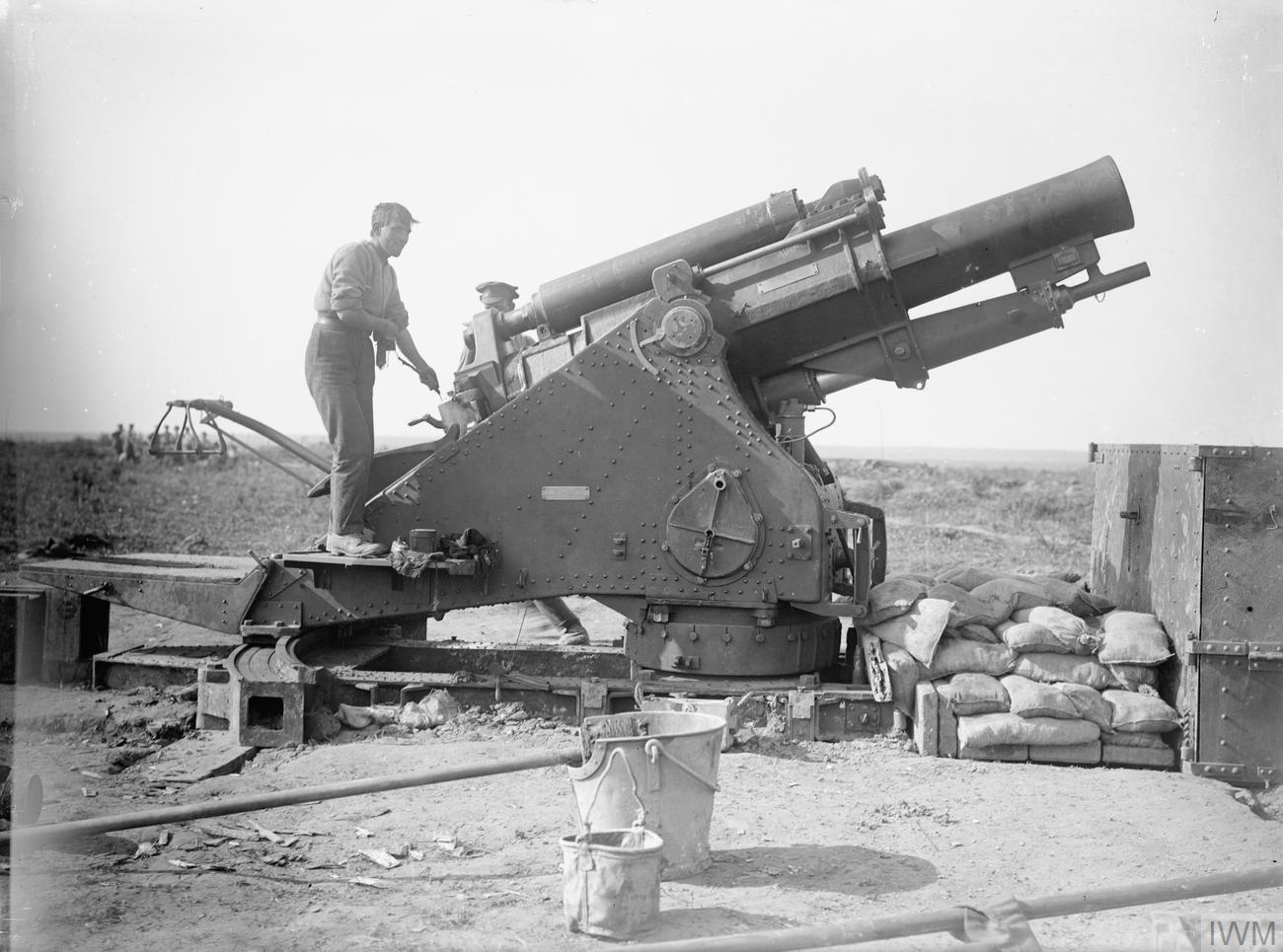
9.2-inch howitzer in action on the Somme, 1916.

Commanded by Major Daniel Sandford, 94th Siege Battery landed in France on 30 May 1916 equipped with four BL 9.2-inch howitzers Mark I and immediately began preparing to support Third Army's Attack on the Gommecourt Salient on the First day on the Somme. The bombardment programme was extended to seven days before Z day (1 July). On Z Day, 94th Siege Bty succeeded in firing 100 rounds per gun in the 65 minutes preceding the attack, a remarkable feat that caused significant damage to the howitzers' buffers and recuperators due to overheating. However, the attack was a failure.

94th Siege Bty then moved to Fifth Army for the later stages of the Somme offensive, which finally died down in November. The battery took part in minor operations on the Ancre in early 1917, including CB fire for II Corps' attack on Miraumont on 17 February. Shortly afterwards, the Germans began their planned withdrawal to the Hindenburg Line (Operation Alberich). Following up was especially difficult for the heavy artillery, with all the roads forwards having been destroyed, and 94th Siege Bty had to haul its howitzers across the devastated countryside.

The battery came back into action during the Arras offensive, supporting the First attack on Bullecourt (11 April). It joined Second Army for the Battle of Messines, being involved in exchanges of CB fire with Germans batteries before the explosion of huge mines launched the successful assault on 7 June. The battery then spent the summer with Fourth Army on the Flanders coast awaiting a breakthrough at Ypres that never came. However, the battery received its heaviest casualties of the war from CB fire. It was rested in late 1917.

On 6 December, 94th Siege Bty joined 23rd Bde, remaining with it until the Armistice. It was increased to six guns when a section joined on 15 January from 190th Siege Bty.

When the German Spring Offensive opened, 94th Siege Bty was supporting Fifth Army. After firing its SOS tasks in support of the infantry, the battery had to withdraw under fire. During the 'Great Retreat' the battery moved 85 miles (137 km) by road, prepared 13 positions, firing from nine of them, and had fired over 1500 rounds. Casualties had been light.

In the summer of 1918, the battery supported Australian Corps' surprise attack on Hamel on 4 July, then III Corps at Amiens on 8 August. During the advance in late August 1918, the battery's forward observation officer, Capt R.A.E. Somerville, found two abandoned German 7.7 cm field guns near Marincourt. With the assistance of his telephonists, he turned one gun round and fired over 100 rounds at the retreating enemy, for which he was awarded a Military Cross. The two guns were sent home as trophies, one to the Durham RGA and one to the town of Sunderland.

The battery then took part in several of the set-piece battles of the Hundred Days Offensive including the Australian–US attack at the St Quentin Canal. However the 9.2-inch howitzers were too clumsy to be much use in the pursuit. The battery's last action was at the assault crossing of the Sambre on 4 November.

94th Siege Bty was intended to form 144th Bty, RGA, in the interim order of battle for the postwar army, but this was rescinded after the signing of the Treaty of Versailles and it disbanded at Dover on 24 June 1919.

=== 149th Siege Battery ===
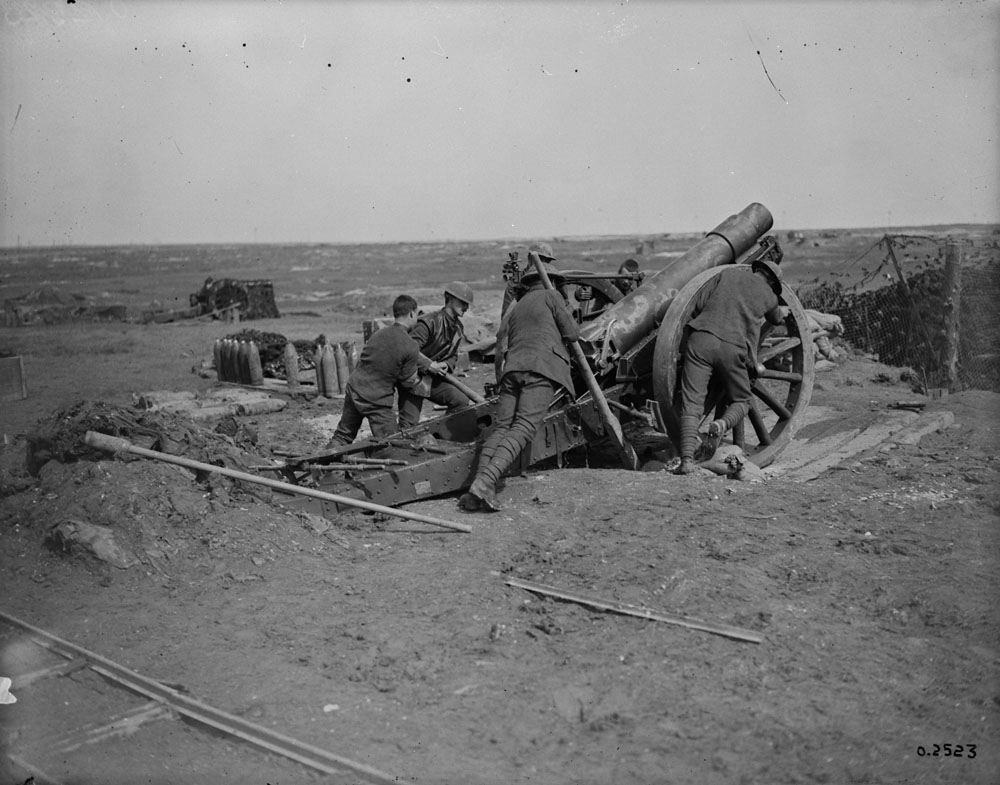
Crew positioning a 6-inch 26 cwt howitzer in 1918.

149th Siege Bty was formed at Hartlepool on 22 May 1916 under Army Council Instruction 1091 of 29 May 1916, which laid down that it was to follow the establishment for New Army units, with a cadre of four officers and 78 men from the Durham RGA. It went out to the Western Front on 21 August and joined 3rd HAG with Fourth Army on 28 August at the height of the Battle of the Somme. It transferred to 14th HAG on 16 October. Once the Somme offensive was over, 149th Siege Bty went back to 3rd HAG on 2 December. This group was now with Fifth Army but transferred to Fourth on 22 December. However, on 24 December149th Siege Bty was ordered to 35th HAG with Third Army, which it joined on 31 December.

While Canadian Corps with First Army attacked Vimy Ridge on 9 April 1917 (see above), VII Corps with Third Army simultaneously assaulted the Hindenburg Line south of Arras. 39th Heavy Artillery Group, which 149th Siege Bty had joined on 11 February, supported this attack. Preliminary bombardment began on 4 April, with VII Corps assigning a range of tasks to its 6-inch howitzer batteries: cutting the barbed wire in the distant second and third German trench lines; targeting the trench systems themselves; and CB work. At night, the 6-inch howitzers might be called on to supplement the 60-pdrs for distant HF tasks, mainly to prevent the Germans from repairing the damage. Most of 8 April (which should have been the day of the attack) was devoted to CB fire to neutralise every known enemy gun position and observation post (OP), and to complete the wire-cutting. When the infantry divisions went over the top on 9 April, the 6-inch howitzers laid a standing barrage on the support line of the German front trench system, then, when the creeping barrage fired by field guns ahead of the infantry reached this line, the standing barrage was shifted onto the second objective. VII Corps' two right-hand divisions were held up in front of the Hindenburg Line, where the distant wire had not been cut, but the two on the left penetrated as much as 2 miles (3.2 km) into the German positions, with relatively light casualties, largely thanks to the artillery support. Bitter fighting, with progressively less success, went on along the Arras front for several more weeks before the offensive was called off in mid-May.

149th Siege Bty moved back to 35th HAG on 30 May, then to 58th HAG on 9 June, while minor operations continued against the Hindenburg Line, then it returned to 39th HAG on 16 June. There was then a quiet phase on Third Army's front while attention moved elsewhere.

149th Siege Bty came under 59th HAG from 9 August, but then it was called upon to move north to the Ypres sector to join 81st HAG with Fifth Army on 31 August. This was the period of the battles of the Menin Ridge Road and Polygon Wood. When Second Army took over the lead in the offensive, the battery joined it and came under 72nd HAG on 4 October for the final battles of Passchendaele.

149th Siege Bty joined 67th HAG (67th Bde, RGA) with First Army on 15 December 1917 and remained with it until the Armistice. 67th was a 'Mixed' brigade with a variety of different heavy guns and howitzers. The battery was at rest from 3 February 1918 when it was joined by section of 448th Siege Bty on 22 February to bring it up to six guns. (Note: 448th Siege Battery, RGA, was formed on 8 June 1917 at Aldershot. It went out to the Western Front on 6 February 1918. Two sections joined First Army on 22 February where one section was posted to 149th Siege Bty and one to 254th Siege Bty; the third section joined Fourth Army and was posted to 174th Siege Bty.) The battery served with First Army through the battles of 1918.

In the postwar 'interim army' plans, 149th Siege Bty was intended to become C Bty in 55th Bde, RGA, but was disbanded in 1919 after the Treaty of Versailles.

=== Home defence ===
After so many TF coast gunners had departed to units in the field, the remaining companies of the defended ports units were consolidated in April 1917. In the case of the Durham RGA, this meant reorganising the seven remaining companies (1/1, 1/2, 1/4, 2/1, 2/2, 2/3, 2/4) into Nos 1–3 Companies in the Tees and Hartlepool Garrison of Northern Command. By April 1918, the Tees and Hartlepool guns were organised as follows:

- No 17 Fire Control (Hartlepool)
- Tees South Gare Battery – 2 × 4.7-inch QF
- Hartlepool Lighthouse Battery – 1 × 6-inch Mk VII
- Heugh Battery – 2 × 6-inch Mk VII
- Old Pier Battery – 2 × 4.7-inch QF

After the Armistice with Germany, the TF was demobilised and the Durham RGA placed in suspended animation in 1919.

== Interwar ==
When the TF was reconstituted on 7 February 1920, the Durham RGA reformed at West Hartlepool, with one battery (later numbered 186) from Nos 1–3 Companies and one battery (later 187) from No 4 Company at Hartlepool. In 1921, the TF was reorganised as the Territorial Army (TA) and the unit was designated as the Durham Coast Brigade, RGA. The RGA was subsumed into the Royal Artillery on 1 June 1924 and the unit was again redesignated, this time as the Durham Heavy Brigade, RA. It fell within the 50th (Northumbrian) Divisional Area.

The HQ was still at The Armoury in West Hartlepool, which was shared with the 3rd (Durham) Battery, RFA, and the 5th Battalion Durham Light Infantry. The commanding officer was Major Leonard Ropner (1895–1977), who was a director of a local shipping firm and had won a MC commanding a battery in France during the war. His younger brother, William Guy Ropner, was also a major in the Durham Heavy Brigade. Leonard Ropner later became an MP and was created a baronet.

In 1926, it was decided that the coast defences of the UK would be manned by the TA alone. In 1932, HQ of the Durham Heavy Bde moved to the Drill Hall in Ward Street, Hartlepool and, on 1 October, 186 Battery was converted to a Medium Battery and transferred to the 54th (Durham and West Riding) Medium Bde RA. The unit raised a new battery numbered 174 in October 1937. In line with the RA's modernisation of its terminology, the unit was entitled the Durham Heavy Regiment on 1 November 1938.

== World War II ==
At the outbreak of war in September 1939, the Durham Heavy Rgt was under the orders of Northern Command. The coast artillery branch was greatly expanded after the Dunkirk evacuation, when the UK was in imminent danger of invasion. On 14 July 1940 the Durham Heavy Rgt was reorganised as 511 (Durham) and 526 (Durham) Coast Regiments.

=== 511th (Durham) Coast Regiment ===
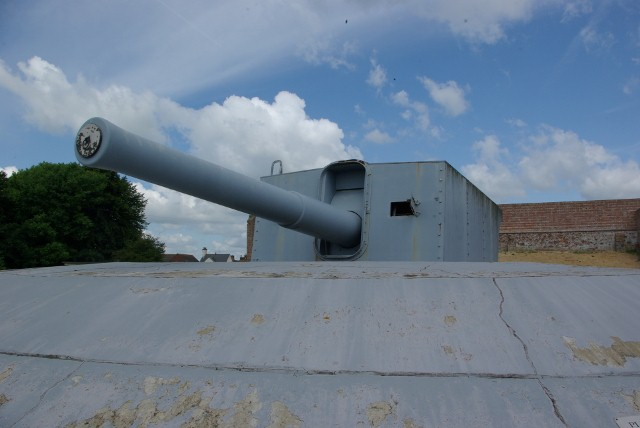
9.2-inch Coastal gun preserved at Imperial War Museum Duxford.

The regiment was formed mainly from 174 Hvy Bty, reorganised as A and B Btys. In the autumn of 1940 it was guarding Hartlepool, manning one 9.2-inch gun and four 6-inch guns. 315 Coast Bty, formed on 10 June 1940 at Seaton Carew (2 × 6-inch guns), was regimented with 511th Coast Rgt on 31 December 1940.

A and B Btys were numbered 267 and 268 on 1 April 1941. At this point, 267 was manning the guns at Heugh Lighthouse, 268 at Hartlepool Old Pier. On 3 June 1941, 268 Bty went to the Orkneys, joining 534th (Orkney) Coast Rgt, being replaced on 5 June by 139 Bty from 533rd (Orkney) Coast Rgt.

At their height, in September 1941, the Tees/Hartlepool defences manned by 511th and 526th Coast Rgts comprised 1 × 9.2-inch gun, 6 × 6-inch, and 2 × 12-pounders. RHQ of 511th Coast Rgt was at Hartlepool, part of Hartlepool Fire Command. In early 1942 the two regiments came under command of IX Corps, changing to Corps Coast Artillery, Northumbrian District, when IX Corps went to North Africa in Operation Torch at the end of the year.

In January 1942, 267 Coast Bty had 21 (Static) Defence Troop, RA, attached to it for local protection. On 11 June 1942, 397 Bty was attached to 511th from 536th Coast Rgt, but it left at the end of the month to join 509th (Tynemouth) Coast Rgt.

From late 1942, with the danger of invasion having passed and with demands on manpower from other theatres, the UK's coast defences began to be reduced. On 11 March 1943 RHQ of 511th (Durham ) Coast Rgt was ordered to begin the process of going into suspended animation. The three batteries (139, 267 and 315) transferred to 526th (Durham) Coast Rgt on 1 April, and RHQ completed the process on 21 April.

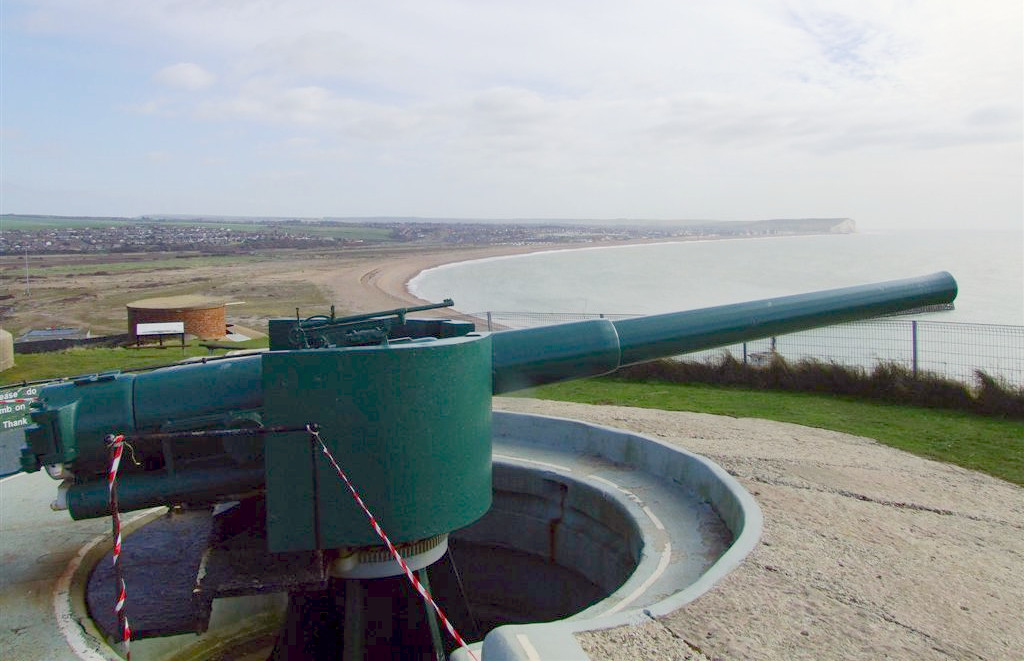
Mk VII 6-inch gun in typical coast defence emplacement, preserved at Newhaven Fort.

=== 526th (Durham) Coast Regiment ===
The regiment was formed mainly from 187 Hvy Bty, reorganised as A and B Btys, which were numbered 116 and 117 on 1 April 1941. At this time 116 was at Pasley, and 117 at South Gare, both near Coatham. By late 1941 RHQ was at Pasley Battery in Pasley Fire Command. (Note: Farndale misidentifies Pasley Battery as Paisley, Renfrewshire.) In the summer of 1941 the regiment was joined by the newly formed 67 Coast Observer Detachment. In April 1942, 316 Bty at Whitby and 317 Bty at Scarborough (2 × 6-inch guns each) were incorporated from 544th Coast Rgt, and in July 526th Rgt took over 29 Coast Observer Detachment from the same regiment.

When the regiment took over the batteries from 511th (Durham) Coast Rgt on 1 April 1943, command of 316 and 317 Btys was in turn transferred to 513th (East Riding) Coast Rgt. This left 526th Rgt in control of 116, 117, 139, 267 and 315 Btys. 513th Coast Rgt also took over 29 Coast Observer Detachment from 526th by November 1943. Early in 1944 the Northumbrian District coastal artillery HQ was scrapped and the CA units came directly under Northern Command.

The manpower requirements for the forthcoming Allied invasion of Normandy (Operation Overlord) led to further reductions in coast defences in April 1944. By this stage of the war many of the coast battery positions were manned by Home Guard detachments or were in the hands of care and maintenance parties. 513th (East Riding) Coast Rgt was disbanded and 316, 317 and 320 Btys joined 526th; later in April both 29 and 67 Coast Observer Detachments were disbanded.

With the war in Europe coming to an end, this process was accelerated at the end of 1944. 508th (Tynemouth) and 512th (East Riding) Coast Rgts had both been converted into garrison units for service in North West Europe, and on 15 February 1945 the remnants of their batteries joined 526th (Durham) Coast Rgt (259, 260, 262, 263, 264, 266, 310, 311, 312, 313, 314, 348 from 508th; 100, 269, 271, 272, 273, 274, 275, 276, 319 from 512th).

Finally, on 1 June 1945, RHQ of 526th (Durham) Coast Rgt began to enter suspended animation at Redcar, completing the process on 22 June. Of its subunits, the TA batteries (those numbered up to 300) passed into suspended animation, the war-formed batteries (numbered above 300) were disbanded. That left just 273 and 348 Coast Btys in existence under Northern Command. 273 Coast Bty entered suspended animation between 19 October and 1 November 1945, while 348 Bty later joined 4 Coast Training Rgt, RA.

== Postwar ==
Both regiments were reformed in the TA in 1947, 511 becoming 426 (Durham) Coast Regiment and 526 becoming 427 (Durham) Coast Regiment, both still based at West Hartlepool. Both regiments were subordinated to 103 Coast Brigade, based at Darlington.

However, it was soon afterwards decided to reduce the number of TA coast regiments and, on 1 September 1948, 427 Regiment was converted into an air defence unit as 427 (Durham) Heavy Anti-Aircraft Regiment. It became a 'Mixed' regiment (indicating that members of the Women's Royal Army Corps were integrated into the unit) on 1 January 1949. On 1 January 1954, this unit merged into 485 (Tees) HAA Regiment at Middlesbrough.

The coast artillery branch was disbanded in 1956, and, on 31 October, 426 Regiment was converted to Royal Engineers (RE) as 336 (Durham Coast) Field Squadron, RE as part of 132 Field Engineer Regiment (formerly part of the Tyne Electrical Engineers). Shortly afterwards, it was redesignated 336 (Durham Coast) Crane Operating Squadron. 132 Regiment was disbanded in 1961; 336 Sqn was transferred to the Royal Corps of Transport in 1965.

== Honorary Colonels ==
The following served as Honorary Colonels of the unit and its predecessors:

- Sir Hedworth Williamson, Bt, appointed Hon Col of 1st Durham Volunteer Artillery 17 November 1888, died 26 August 1900.
- Col Robert Lauder, VD, appointed Hon Col of 4th Durham RGA 24 June 1905 and subsequently of the combined Durham RGA, 1 April 1908.
- Edwin Vaux, CB, VD, appointed Hon Col of 1st Durham RGA 9 June 1906, died 25 June 1908.
- John Lambton, 3rd Earl of Durham, VD, appointed Hon Col of Durham Heavy Brigade 29 September 1921, died 18 September 1928.
- Sir Leonard Ropner, 1st Baronet, MC, TD, MP, appointed Hon Col of Durham Heavy Brigade 1 January 1930.

== Memorials ==
A memorial plaque was placed at Heugh Battery to mark the spot 'where the first shell from the leading German battle cruiser fell at 8.10 am on 16 December 1914 and also records the place where during the bombardment the first British soldier was killed on British soil by enemy action during the Great War 1914–1918'.

There is also a memorial window at St Hilda's Church, Hartlepool, 'in memory of the officers, non-commissioned officers and gunners of the Durham Royal Garrison Artillery who fell in the Great War 1914–1918'.

The parade ground of the former Durham RGA HQ at The Armoury became the site of the West Hartlepool War Memorial

== Museums ==
The medals of Lt-Col Lancelot Robson, who commanded the Durham RGA during the Raid on Hartlepool, are held by Hartlepool Borough Council Museums Service.
