= Heugh Battery =

Artillery battery and museum in Hartlepool, England

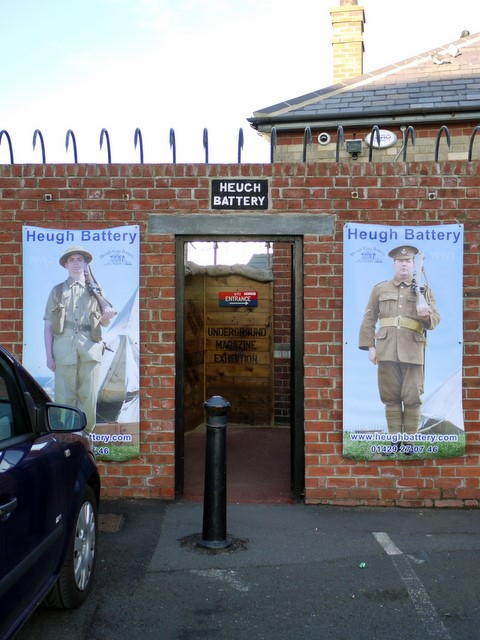
Heugh Battery entrance

The Heugh (pronounced: /jʊf/) Gun Battery is located on the Headland at Hartlepool, County Durham, England. The museum bills itself as the only battlefield of World War I in Great Britain.

== History ==
Heugh Battery was one of three erected in 1860 to protect the fast-growing port of Hartlepool. Heugh and Lighthouse Battery were placed close by the lighthouse and armed with four and two 68pr smoothbore guns respectively. The third battery, Fairy Cove mounted three of the same weapons and was slightly further to the north at the end of the town moor.

The original battery was modified for three 64pr Rifled Muzzle Loading guns in the 1880s and then fell out of use with the introduction of breech loaders on hydropneumatic mounts in 1893. The lighthouse battery was reconstructed for one of these guns, a 6-inch Mk VI and a further two were placed in Cemetery Battery north of the town.

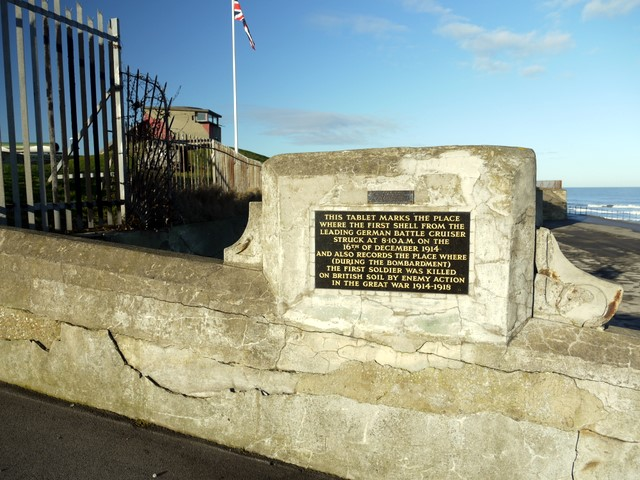
Plaque commemorating the events of 16 December 1914. © Copyright Andrew Curtis and licensed for reuse under this Creative Commons Licence

In 1900 Heugh was completely reworked for two 6-inch Mk VII guns using the standard configuration of two emplacements with underground magazine between. The defences were further modified in 1907 when the Lighthouse gun was replaced with a 6inch Mk VII and the Cemetery Battery closed. Manned by the Territorial Force gunners of the Durham Royal Garrison Artillery, these were the three guns that were to see action in the Bombardment of Hartlepool on 16 December 1914. During the bombardment (at 08:10), the leading German battle cruiser fired a shell which struck aground less than 100 metres from the battery. This marked the first death in action of a soldier on British soil in World War I. A plaque commemorating the event is found on the coastal walkway just outside the battery.

In 1936 the No 1 gun was removed and the Lighthouse Battery integrated into Heugh Battery so that the Lighthouse gun became Heugh No 1. A Barr and Stroud rangefinder was also introduced.

In 1939 the Territorial Army was mobilised and the battery was manned by men of the Durham Heavy Regiment, Royal Artillery. During the early part of the Second World War new rangefinding and fire control equipment was introduced, paving the way to conversion to the Coast Defence / Anti Aircraft role in 1942. The Lighthouse and remaining Heugh emplacement were reworked for turret mounted 6inch Mk 24 guns and an emplacement for a third (No 3) was built a hundred yards to the north though it seems unlikely that a gun was ever mounted here.

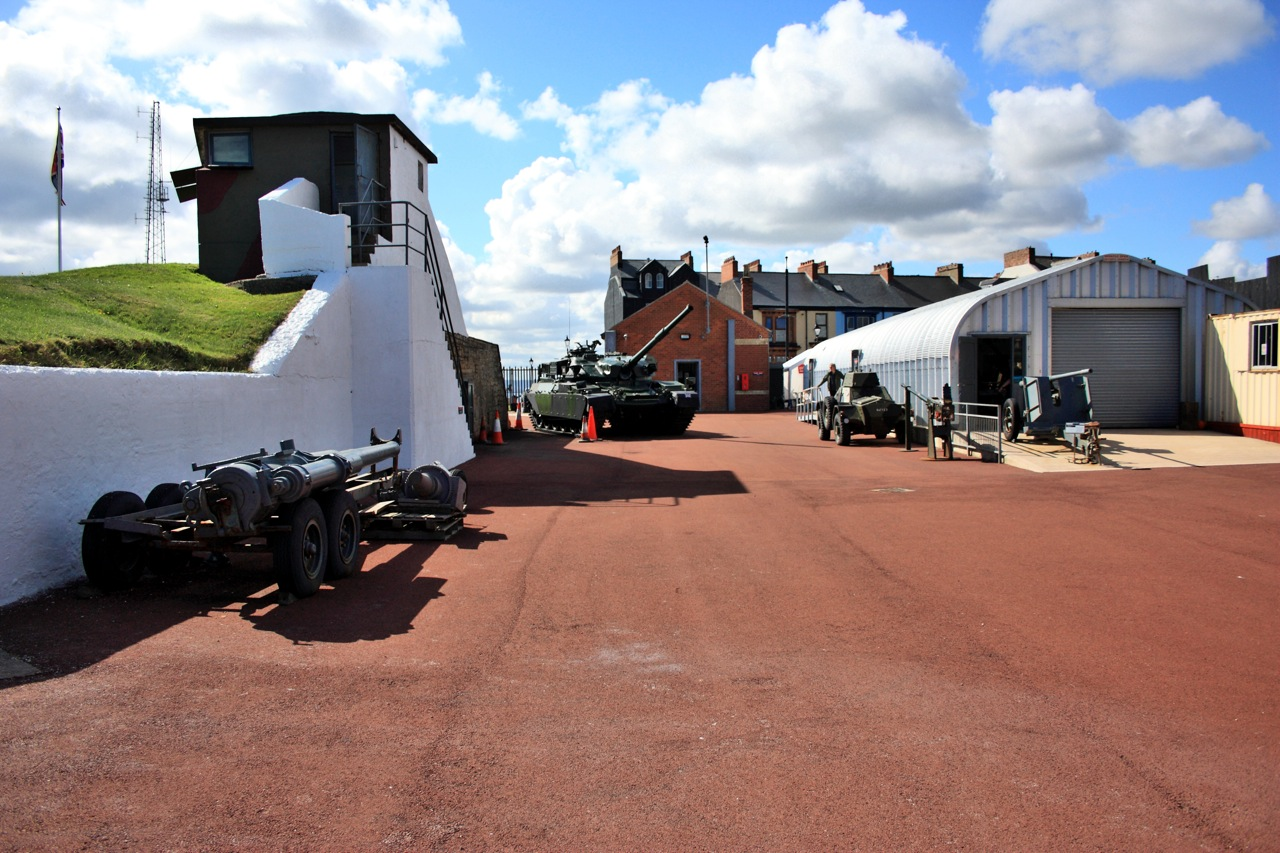
Present-day view inside the battery compound

Heugh Battery was mothballed in 1944 to be reopened in 1947 and shortly after QF 3.7 inch AA guns were introduced. The battery closed in 1956 with the closing of coast defence. The battery is now in the care of the Heugh Gun Battery Trust and is home to a museum and artillery collection.

In the 2020s the battery was found to be in need of restoration, so Historic England donated £40,000 to pay for a comprehensive survey of the structure.

== See also ==
- 54.697121°N 1.176655°W map coordinates
