= Seaton Carew Lighthouse =

Lighthouse in North-East England

Seaton Carew lighthouse
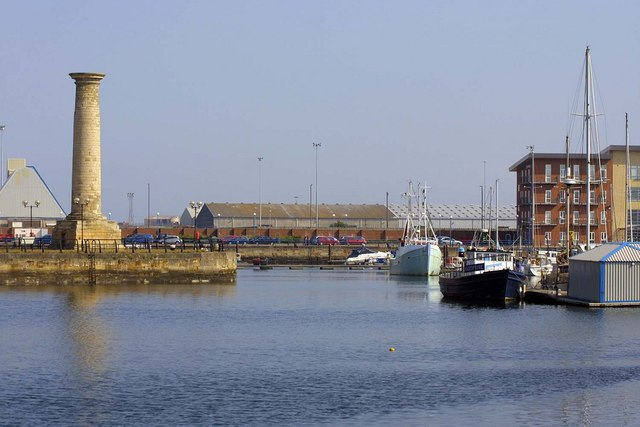
- The surviving stone column of Seaton High Light, re-erected at Hartlepool Marina
- Location: Hartlepool, County Durham, England
- Coordinates: 54°41′30″N 1°12′08″W

Tower
- Constructed: 1838
- Construction: ashlar sandstone tower
- Height: plimsol 19 metres (62 ft)
- Shape: cylindrical tower with lantern removed
- Markings: unpainted tower
- Operator: Tees Navigation Company (–1892)
- Heritage: High light: Grade II listed building

Light
- Deactivated: 1892
- Characteristic: high light: F W (not in use) low light: F R (not in use)

The Seaton Carew lighthouses were a pair of leading light towers built in Seaton Carew to guide ships into the River Tees. The low light was demolished over a century ago and what remained of the high light has been rebuilt in Hartlepool Marina.

Under increasing commercial pressure from the docks at West Hartlepool the Tees Navigation Company decided to improve access to the River Tees by providing a pair of leading lighthouses (navigation light towers) on the coast at Seaton Carew. These were not the first lighthouses in Seaton Carew as there is evidence of an earlier lighthouse in the 15th century.

== Seaton Carew Low Light ==
The Low Light was on what is now Coronation Drive on the sea front at the junction with Lawson Road. The Low Light was a 70 feet (21 m) tall hexagonal tower with the base at a height of 34 feet (10 m) above mean high tide and exhibited a fixed red light. The Hartlepool steel works of South Durham Steel and Iron Company was built to the north of Seaton Carew low light. In a Board of Trade report into the grounding of the Vine in January 1877 off the mouth of the Tees it was claimed that the glow from the furnaces of the nearby steel plant may have been mistaken for the red low light.

== Seaton Carew High Light ==
The re-erected High Light

The High Light and cottages were 1,189 yards (1,087 m) inland to the west at the end of Windermere Road in what is now the Longhill Industrial Estate in Hartlepool north of Tees Bay Retail Park. The High Light was a 70 feet (21 m) tall Tuscan column of ashlar sandstone built in 1838 with the base at a height of 89 feet (27 m) above mean high tide. The High Light contained a newel helical stair lit by slit windows between the masonry blocks. The High Light also known as the Longhill Lighthouse, exhibited a fixed white light.

== Deactivation and relocation ==
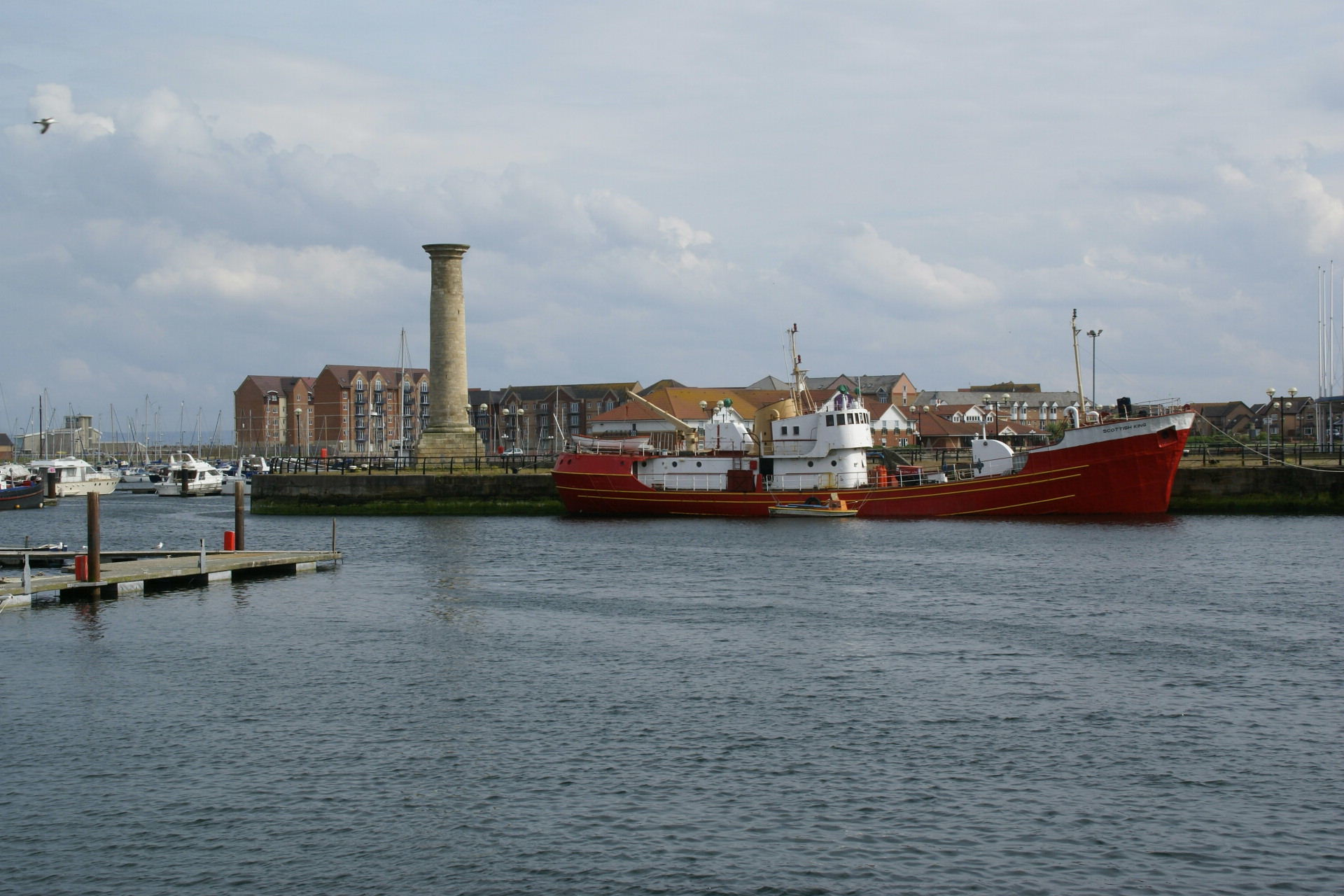
Seaton Tower, Hartlepool Marina

In 1884 a new lighthouse was built on the breakwater at the newly constructed South Gare on the south bank at the mouth of the River Tees. Both light systems were used until 1892 when use of the light towers at Seaton Carew and Hartlepool was discontinued by the Tees Conservancy Commissioners. The low light was probably demolished a decade later in 1902 to make way for a coastal tramway and road from Hartlepool. The prospect of this demolition may have prompted local artist Thomas Grainger to create a painting of the lighthouse before it disappeared.

By 1985 although the High Light tower was disused and dilapidated and had lost its gallery, it was given grade II listed building status. In 1995 the tower now known as Seaton Tower, was moved by the Teesside Development Corporation to the recently regenerated Hartlepool Marina at Jackson's Landing to become a focal point, and in 1997 it was dedicated as a memorial to those who have lost their lives at sea.

== See also ==
- List of lighthouses in England
