= Hartlepool Marina =

Marina in County Durham, England

Coordinates: 54.6912°N 1.2011°W

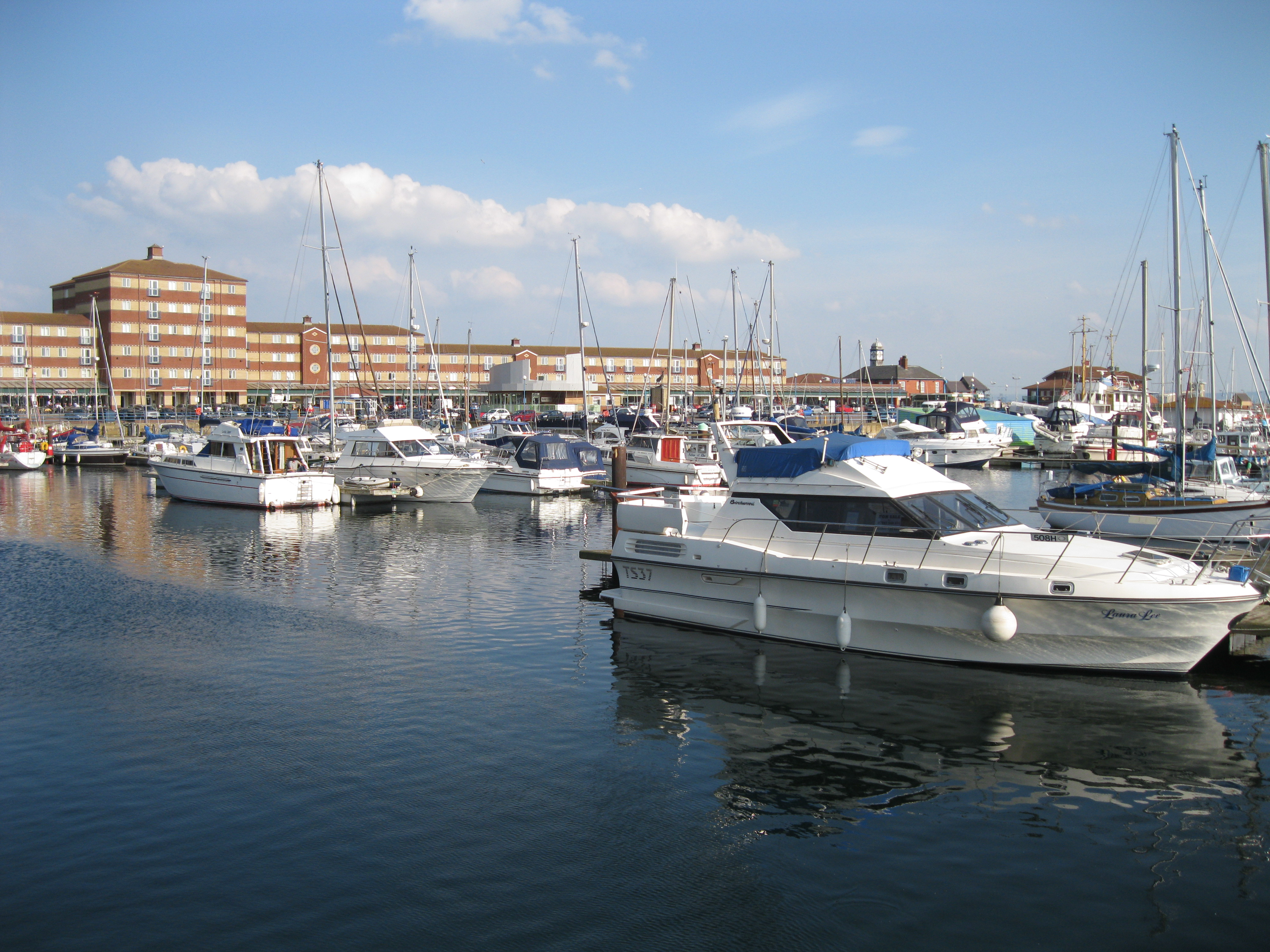
- Hartlepool Marina

- Location within County Durham
- OS grid reference: NZ5133
- Unitary authority: Hartlepool
- Ceremonial county: County Durham
- Region: North East
- Country: England
- Sovereign state: United Kingdom
- Post town: HARTLEPOOL
- Postcode district: TS24
- Dialling code: 01429
- Police: Durham
- Fire: County Durham and Darlington
- Ambulance: North East
- UK Parliament: Hartlepool

Hartlepool Marina is a basin used for mooring yachts in the former docks of Hartlepool in County Durham, England.

== History ==
The site was formerly known as the Hartlepool South Docks: the last company to operate there was William Gray & Company, which went into voluntary liquidation in 1964. The docks then remained vacant and deteriorating until Teesside Development Corporation launched an initiative to convert them into a marina in the late 1980s. The Lovell Partnership was appointed as the lead developer. The new marina was opened by Queen Elizabeth II, who was accompanied by the Duke of Edinburgh, in May 1993.

The Seaton Carew Lighthouse was relocated to the marina in 1995 and dedicated to those who had died at sea in 1997. Also in the 1990s, a statue of the monkey, formerly standing in West Hartlepool, was relocated to the marina to serve as a receptible for coins being collected for a local hospice.

Meanwhile, the former graving dock, at the west end of the marina, was redeveloped as Hartlepool Historic Quay: it opened in July 1994 and became known as Hartlepool's Maritime Experience in April 2005 and was renamed the National Museum of the Royal Navy, Hartlepool in June 2016.

== Operations ==
Hartlepool Marina has 500 berths with pontoons, all of which can be accessed by pontoon. It accommodates both pleasure and working craft, with passage to and from the sea through a lock.
