= South Gare =

Area at Teesmouth in North Yorkshire, England

Coordinates: 54.640342°N 1.139145°W

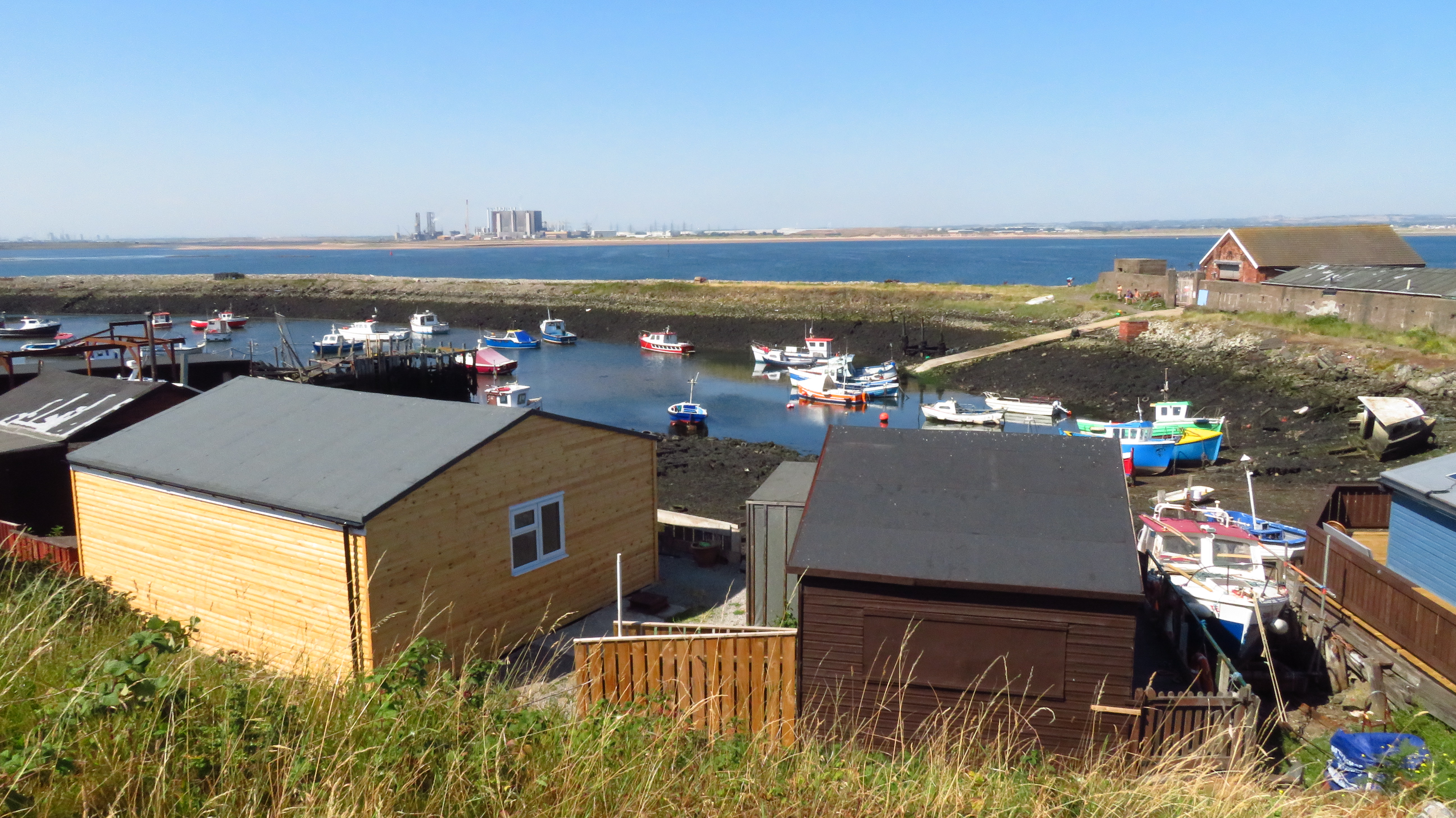
- Paddy's Hole

- Location within North Yorkshire
- Population: 0
- OS grid reference: NZ551274
  - London: 220 mi (350 km) SSE
- Unitary authority: Redcar and Cleveland
- Ceremonial county: North Yorkshire
- Region: North East
- Country: England
- Sovereign state: United Kingdom
- Post town: Redcar
- Postcode district: TS10
- Dialling code: 01642
- Police: Cleveland
- Fire: Cleveland
- Ambulance: North East

South Gare is an area of reclaimed land and breakwater on the southern side of the mouth of the River Tees in Redcar and Cleveland, England. It is accessed by taking the South Gare Road (private road) from Fisherman's Crossing at the western end of Tod Point Road in Warrenby.

Before the building of South Gare, permanent dry land stopped at Tod Point, at the western end of Warrenby, and there was only Coatham Sands and the mudflats of Bran Sands. The creation of South Gare extends this by a further 2.5 miles (4.0 km).

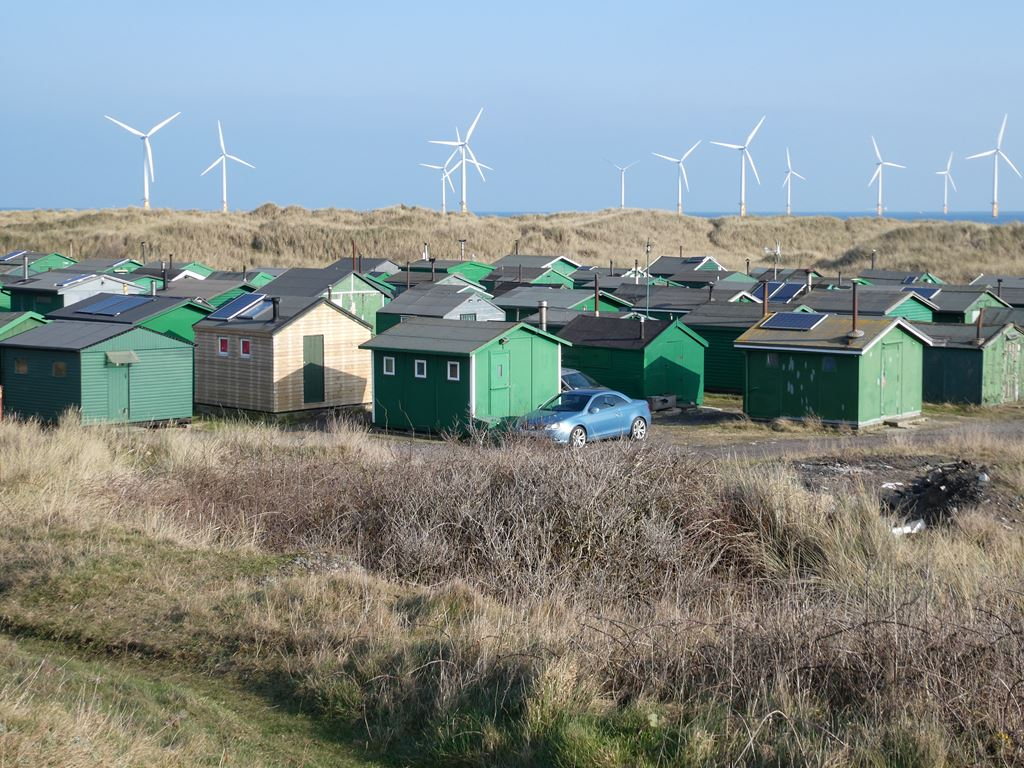
The fishing community

The building of South Gare offers a safe harbour in stormy weather to ships off the coast and allowed for the dredging of the River Tees entrance. South Gare itself was a settlement but the houses there were demolished many years ago.

== History ==
=== Construction ===
Building the 22 miles (35 km) of slag training walls in the Tees was started in 1859. Blocks of solid blast furnace slag were cast and moved into position along the banks of the River Tees, then back filled using 70,000 tons of material dredged from river bed. This canalised the river allowing it to keep itself clean by the action of flow and tides.

The Gare was constructed from January 1861 to 1884 using 5 million tonnes of blast furnace slag and 18,000 tons of cement at a total cost of £219,393. The slag was supplied free from Teesside blast furnaces by ironmasters who paid for its removal. The north end of the breakwater carrying the lighthouse uses blocks of concrete weighing from 40 to 300 tons.

Work was planned and supervised by John Fowler, engineer to the Tees Commissioners. With construction complete, the breakwater was formally opened by the Right Hon W. H. Smith, First Lord of the Treasury on 25 October 1888.

=== Railway ===
To construct South Gare a rail line was built from the Warrenby iron works to carry men and materials. When construction was complete the rail line was used, wind permitting, with a sail bogey to move visitors, servicemen, lifeboatmen and lighthouse crew out to the lighthouse and gun installations close to the end of South Gare. The rail line still exists in places and is easiest to see near the remains of the coastal battery.

=== Defences ===
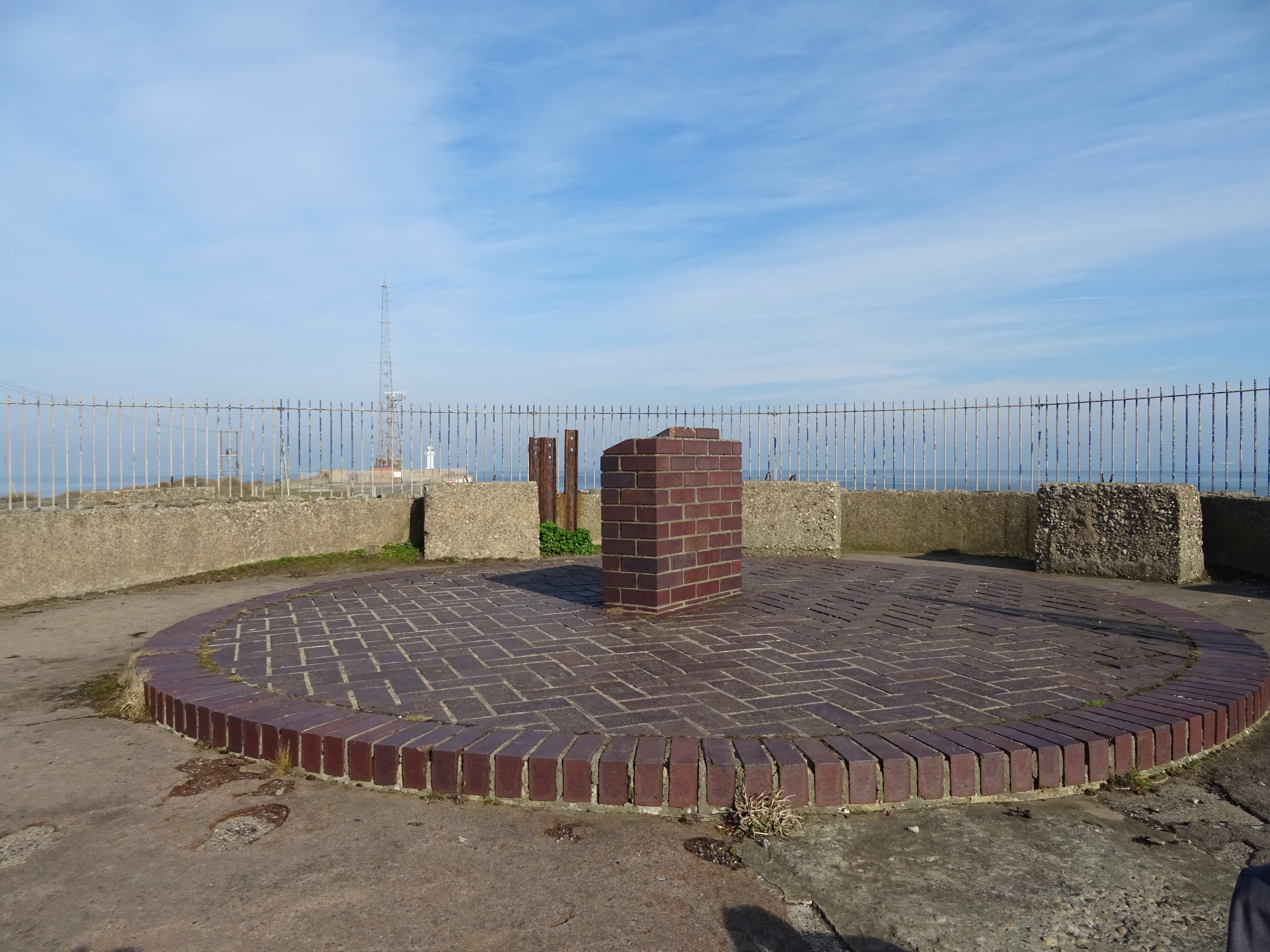
Former gun emplacement the breakwater

The original South Gare battery was built from 1890 to 1892 and fitted with a two gun battery. New guns were fitted to the battery in 1907 but removed in 1920, and in 1938 the battery was reconstructed and fitted with two larger guns. The anti-aircraft batteries, and mortar emplacements have been partially demolished. There are a number of defensive concrete pill boxes still scattered around the area in the dunes and on the beach.

What is now the South Gare Marine Club is the site of a maintenance base for electrically fired submarine mines defending the mouth of the River Tees.

=== Right Hand of Friendship ===
A giant sculpture of the Right Hand of Friendship was proposed for Redcar and Cleveland, at South Gare, as one of series of artworks called Tees Valley Giants. In 2012, however, this series of artworks was discontinued.

== Geography ==
=== River entrance ===
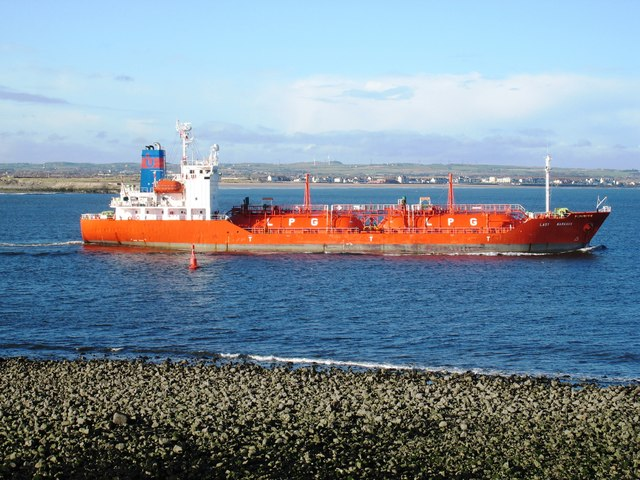
LPG Tanker leaving Teesmouth

The River Tees entrance created between South Gare, and the North Gare to the west is 2,400 feet (732 m) wide. The water depth at the mouth of the Tees at low tide has altered over the years. In 1863 it was 3 ft 6 inches but today stands at 50 feet (15 m). Two suction dredgers and occasionally a grab dredger are used to keep the shipping channel clear.

=== Harbours ===
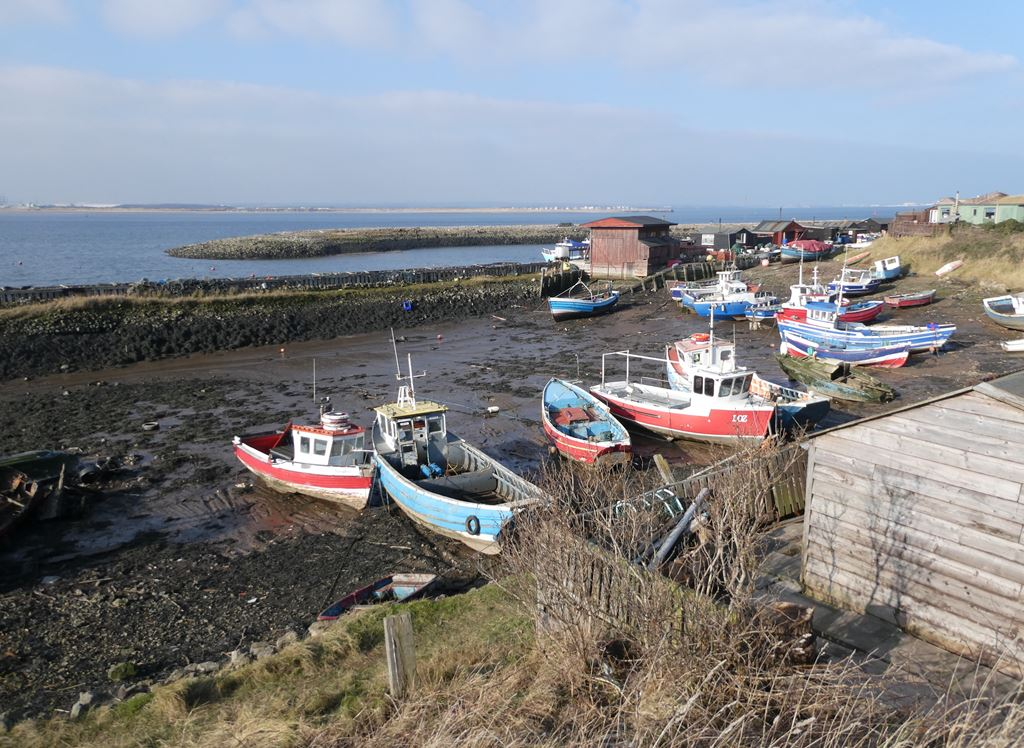
Guy's Hole

Paddy's Hole is a small harbour constructed from slag in the lagoon on the Teesmouth side of South Gare. It is named Paddy's Hole because of the many Irishmen who helped build the South Gare.

There are also two smaller harbours south of Paddy's Hole named Guy's Hole and Powder Hole (or Sand Hole). Between Guy's Hole and Powder Hole is the remains of the Powder Jetty (or Powder Wharf) dating from the First World War or earlier.

=== Sands ===
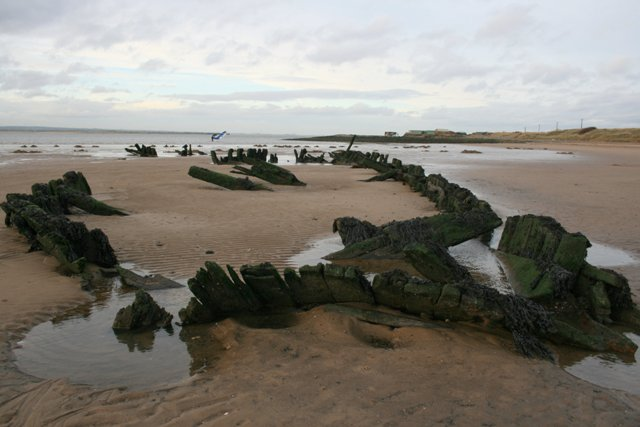
Remains of a wooden ship embedded in Bran Sands

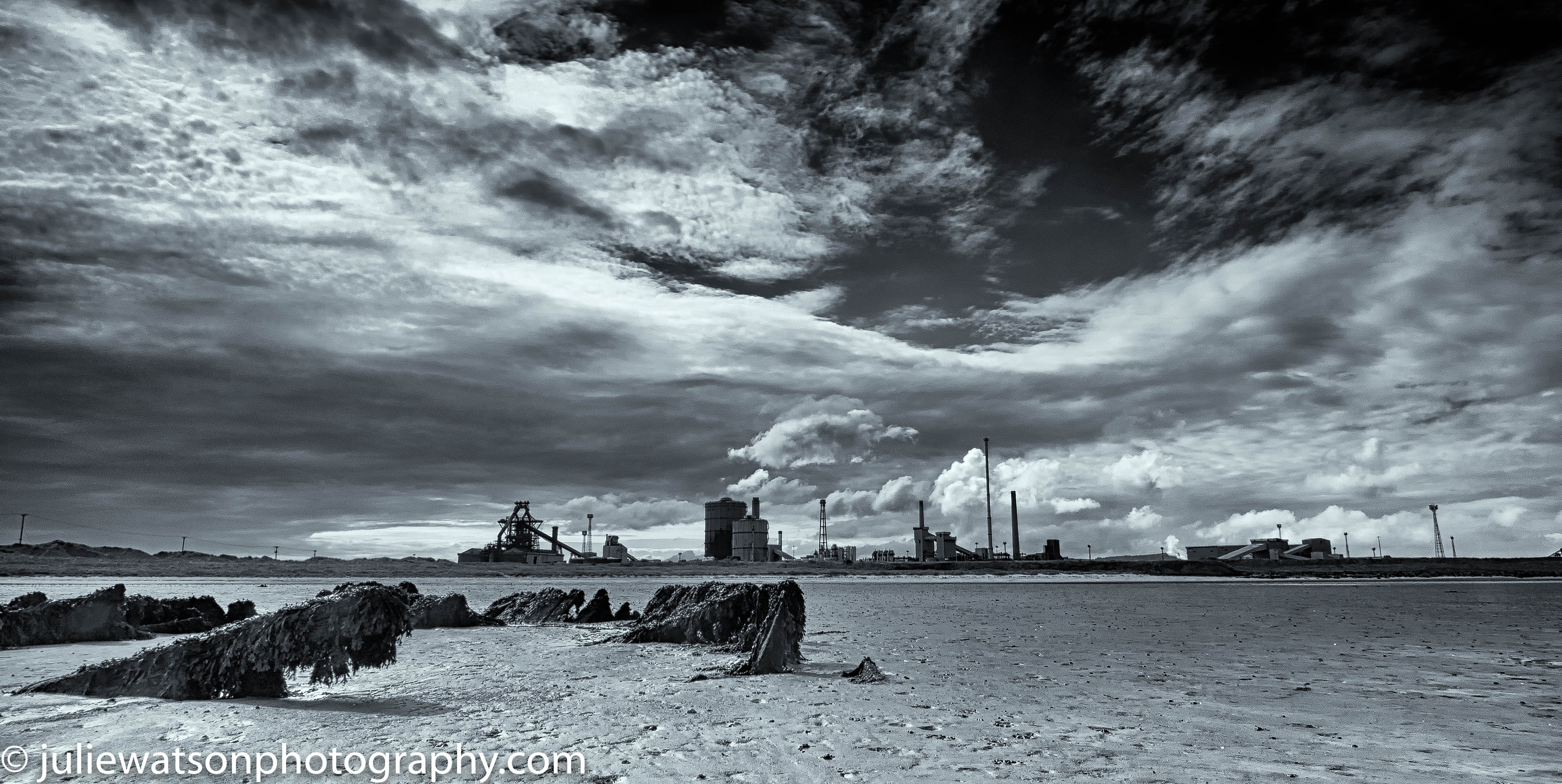
Teesside Derelict Steelworks and Wooden Wreck

South Gare & Coatham Sands are a Site of Special Scientific Interest. The dunes on the eastern flank are protected by three slag banks close to the breakwater known as the German Charlies, partly exposed at low tide. The name German Charlies was applied after a First World War German ship ran aground on them. There is a gas pipeline through the SSSI sand dunes.

On the inner side of the breakwater is Bran Sands, known for its bird life and the wooden wreck of a ship in the sands. A number of underwater wrecks lie off South Gare.

=== Land formation and wildlife ===
The land is made from thousands of tons of basic slag from blast furnaces. The high limestone content of the slag produces a base-rich soil attractive to lime-loving plants. The area consists of tidal mudflats, scrub, grassland, sand dunes, rocks and freshwater and saltwater pools and attracts a very wide range of birds. Seals can also be spotted.

== Industry ==
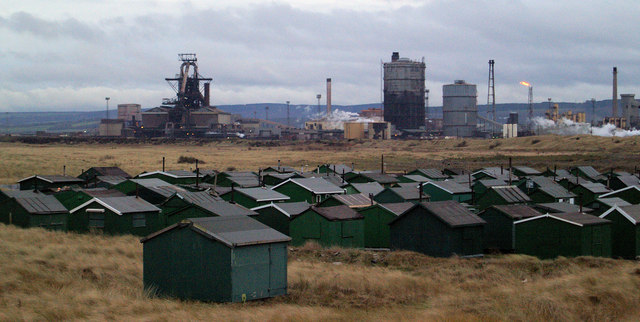
Fishermen's huts and part of SSI Steel Plant

Built on the reclaimed land of Bran Sands are the ore terminal, sinter plant, coke plant and blast furnace of SSI's Teesside Steelworks. The plant was mothballed in 2010, reopening in April 2012, only to be mothballed again on 28 September 2015 and finally closed on 12 October 2015. Next to that is Bran Sands Water Treatment Works.

== Activities ==
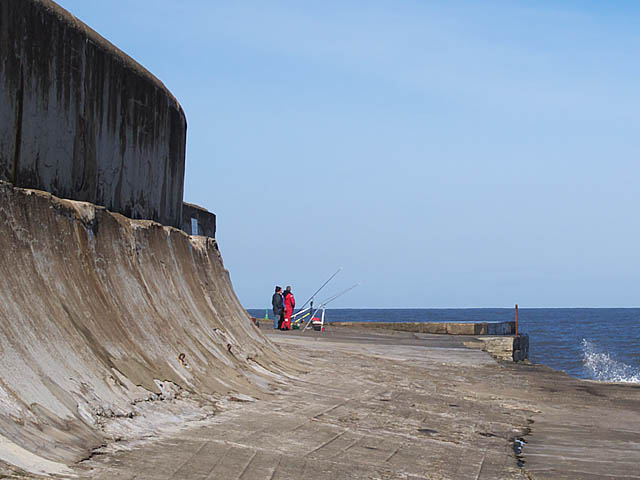
Fishing at the tip of South Gare breakwater

Activities include walking, fishing from small boats and angling from the concrete breakwater, photography of wildlife and shipping, birdwatching, sailing, kite surfing, windsurfing, jet-skiing, diving and motorcycling.

== Services ==
=== Lifeboat station ===
There has been a lifeboat at Teesmouth since 1829, when the RNLI was founded. The present Teesmouth Lifeboat Station was founded in 1911 and in 1914 a boathouse and slipway were built to launch the lifeboat. The lifeboat station has had a Tyne class lifeboat since 1986 and in 2003 new lifeboat crew facilities were built. However the lifeboat station was closed a few years later with coverage being supplied by Hartlepool lifeboat.

=== Tees pilots ===
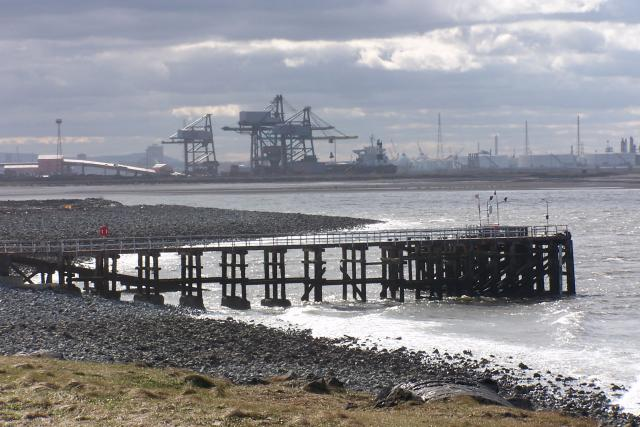
The pilot's pier in Teesmouth

Since 1988 Tees and Hartlepool Port Authority's pilot services for Hartlepool, Teesport and the River Tees have been based at the pilot station at South Gare.

=== South Gare Lighthouse ===
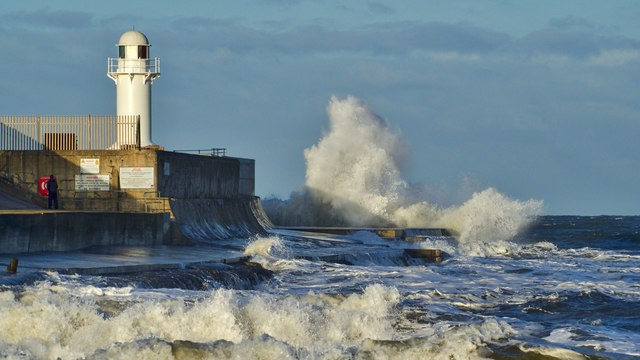
South Gare lighthouse on the breakwater

The South Gare Lighthouse was built in 1884 at the end of South Gare breakwater and is owned and operated by PD Ports.

=== Coastguard station ===
A coastguard station is located south of South Gare Lighthouse. To the immediate south of the coastguard station is a short steel-framed tower housing a radar antenna, an automatic fog detector and a vertical set of four sectored red and white leading lights for navigation purposes. A second fog-detector system is mounted on the Fairway Buoy in Tees Bay outside the river entrance.

=== Wind-speed detection masts ===
Near the end of the breakwater, in the fenced compound, is a tall steel-framed mast housing air-speed measurement devices that gather data on wind speeds at various heights for an offshore wind farm proposed by Northern Offshore Wind Limited. The mast is 164 feet (50 m) tall and 15.3 feet (4.7 m) wide at the base. Plans for the wind farm include thirty 200 feet (61 m) windmills more than 1 mile (1.6 km) offshore. AMEC Wind plans to build 19 wind turbines inside Corus steelworks generating 47.5 MW of electricity.
