= Tees Navigation Company =

Tees Navigation Company Act 1808
- Act of Parliament
- Parliament of the United Kingdom
- Long title: An Act for making a navigable Cut from the East Side of the River Tees near Stockton into the said River near Portrack, in the County of Durham; and making various other Improvements in the Navigation of the said River between the Town of Stockton and the Sea.
- Citation: 48 Geo. 3. c. xlviii

Dates
- Royal assent: 27 May 1808

Text of statute as originally enacted

The Tees Navigation Company was a British company chartered by an act of Parliament, the Tees Navigation Company Act 1808 (48 Geo. 3. c. xlviii), for the purpose of improving navigation of the River Tees between the towns of Stockton-on-Tees and Middlesbrough.

== Background ==
At the beginning of the 19th century, the River Tees had several large meanders between the two towns, especially a large meander beginning at the current location of the Tees Barrage, which looped south for 2.5 miles (4 km) and returned to a point a mere 220 yards (200 m) from the beginning of the meander, near a location known as the Mandale. From there it meandered north and then back south, joining the current channel at a point about 1350 yds (1.2 km) from the Mandale in a roughly west-northwest direction.

These two meanders, along with the tidal nature of the river and the presence of shifting sandbars, made navigation difficult. The journey from Stockton to Middlesbrough could take as long as the journey from Middlesbrough to London. Stockton's flour industry required good river navigation to compete with other ports. Removing the meanders was seen as a means of preventing the town's decline as a port.

== The Mandale Cut ==
The original 1808 act authorised the Mandale Cut. The company dug a channel at the Mandale to cut off the southern meander and opened this improvement in 1810. Although it was a comparatively simple engineering work, political problems had dogged the operation since it was first suggested in the 1790s. In particular, property owned by Lord Harewood lay on the southern meander and would lose all access to the river after the cut was made. Lord Harewood was eventually compensated and the work went ahead.

== The Portrack Cut ==
Tees Navigation Act 1828
- Act of Parliament
- Parliament of the United Kingdom
- Long title: An Act to enable the Tees Navigation Company to make a Navigable Cut from the East Side of the River Tees, near Portrack in the County of Durham, into the said River near Newport in the Township and Parish of Acklam, in the North Riding of the County of York.
- Citation: 9 Geo. 4. c. xcvii

Dates
- Royal assent: 19 June 1828

Text of statute as originally enacted

Cutting off the northern meander required a longer channel to be dug, the final cut being 1,100 yds (1 km) long. Since the northern meander was shorter and the cut longer, the net reduction in distance was less, but the bypassing of islands and sandbars in the Portrack meander still made it worthwhile. The work was authorised by the Tees Navigation Act 1828 (9 Geo. 4. c. xcvii) and completed in 1831, resulting in the present river channel.

== The Tees Conservancy ==
Tees Conservancy Act 1878
- Act of Parliament
- Parliament of the United Kingdom
- Long title: An Act for conferring on the Tees Conservancy Commissioners further powers in relation to the borrowing of money and the levying of tolls, rates, and dues; and for other purposes.
- Citation: 41 & 42 Vict. c. lxxxvi

Dates
- Royal assent: 17 June 1878

Text of statute as originally enacted

Despite these two improvements, the river's usefulness continued to deteriorate. The estuary below Cargo Fleet was treacherous, as the river divided into three channels around various bars and shoals. In the 1850s another act of Parliament, the Tees Conservancy and Stockton Dock Act 1852 (15 & 16 Vict. c. clxii), replaced the Tees Navigation Company with the Tees Conservancy Board which took charge of the entire navigation of the river. Much of the work carried out by this body exploited the growing iron industry in Middlesbrough. Large amounts of slag from the processing of iron ore were dumped along the channel in order to narrow and straighten it, causing the river to flow faster and thus scour its own bed. In addition, there was much work done dredging channels for ships.
