= Portland Raised Beach =

Coastal landform in Dorset, England

Coordinates: 50.516°N 2.459°W

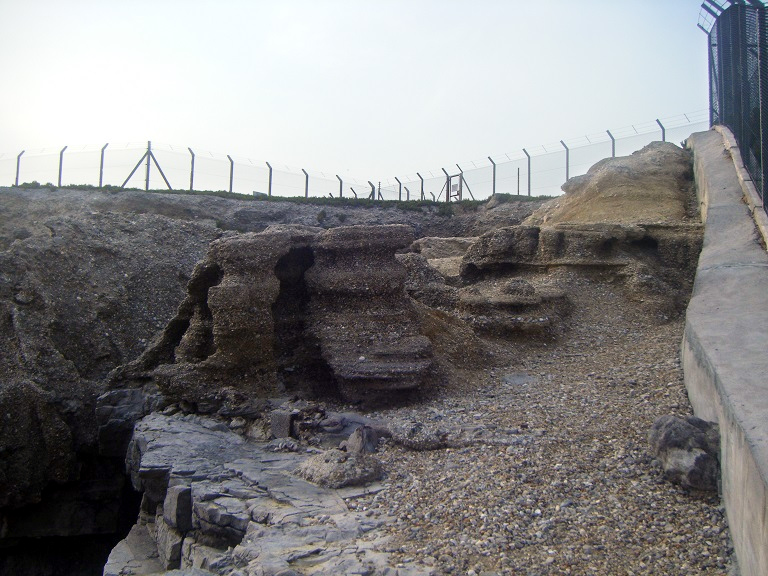
The West Pleistocene Raised Beach.

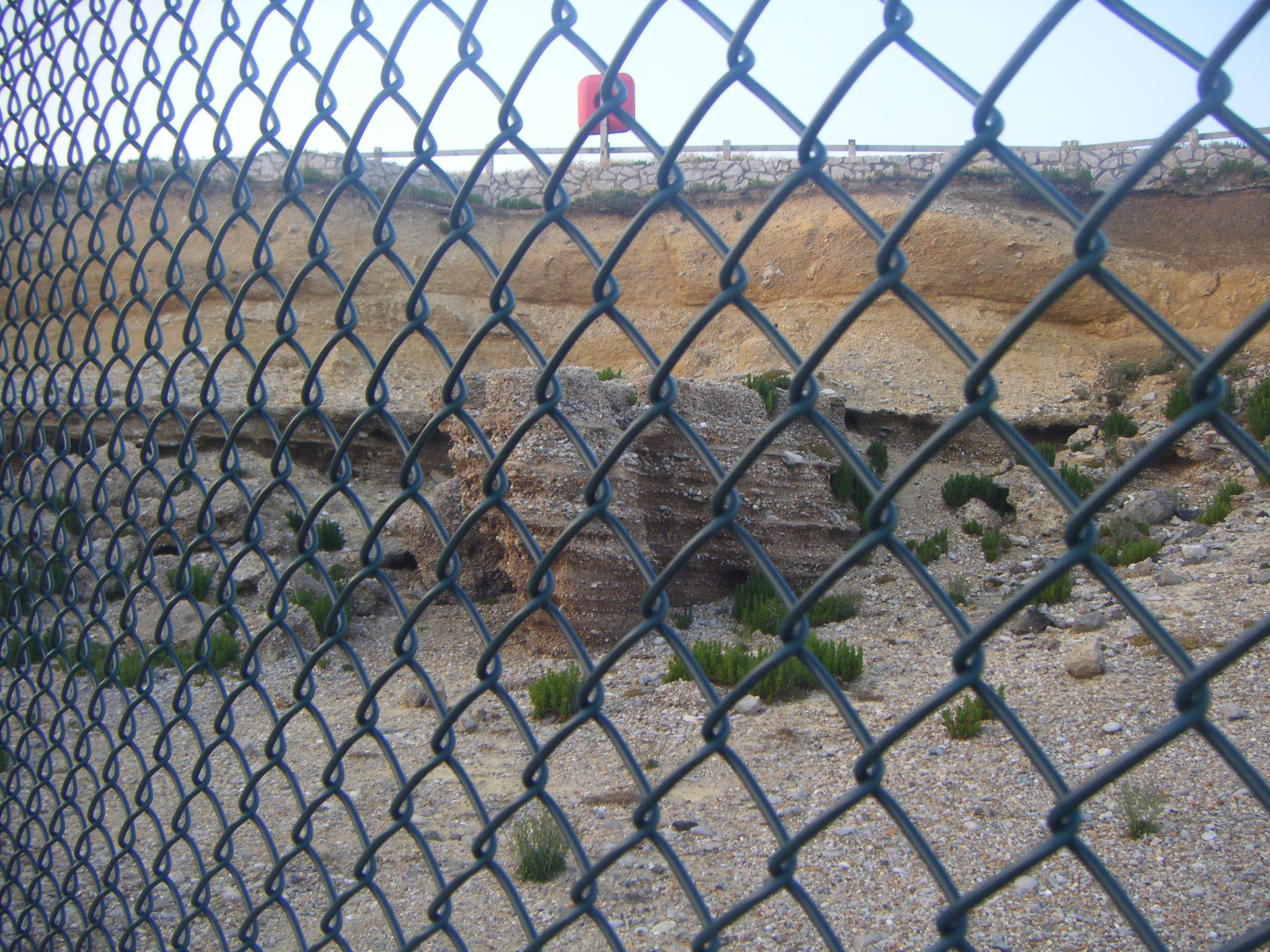
Part of The West Pleistocene Raised Beach inside the Ministry of Defence Magnetic Range.

Portland Raised Beach refers to small raised beaches on either side of Portland Bill, on the Isle of Portland, part of the Jurassic Coast in Dorset, England. The main beach is known as the West Pleistocene Raised Beach; nearby is the East Pleistocene Raised Beach.

They exhibit multi-type erosion and deposition during a warm spell in the last Ice Age in the inter-tidal zone show signs of tide and wave impact during more recent millennia. For some depth, sandy and shelly pebbles predominate. A factor in the higher than average speed shore erosion is the weight of the ice which covered the north of Britain and beyond in the colder spells that caused the British Isles landmass to tilt (see post-glacial rebound) and prevailing south-west currents and breeze, a pace which results in the relatively little water-eroded cliff-based fossils, stones and pebbles along Chesil Beach. Tidally caught fine material (sand) is deposited on most great bays facing the deeper western half or so of the English Channel and only at narrowings along the increasingly shallow eastern half.

== West Pleistocene Raised Beach ==
The West Pleistocene Raised Beach is found close to Portland Bill Lighthouse and Pulpit Rock being next to the Ministry of Defence Magnetic Range so part of the beach is behind fencing. This lies in a shallow embayment known as White Hole. Considered an important feature in the area, the Pleistocene Raised Beach dates from a warm interglacial phase of the Pleistocene ice ages, approximately 200,000 years ago.

The beach is on private land, as is the surrounding ex-quarried land next to the beach, although the public are allowed beyond the warning sign at their own risk. Interference with the deposits of the beach is prohibited.

== East Pleistocene Raised Beach ==
The East Pleistocene Raised Beach is near Cave Hole. The beach deposits are on a slope, with a stone ledge below. An old crane stands on the beach. The beach is about 125,000 years old and has abundant mollusc shells such as species of Patella and Littorina and small bivalves that lived on seaweed. It has been much disturbed by cryoturbation (freezing and thawing) during the late Pleistocene ice age. Human remains have been found in and catalogued from the nearby caves.
