= Red Crane, Portland =

Crane in Portland, Dorset, England

Coordinates: 50.5152°N 2.4531°W

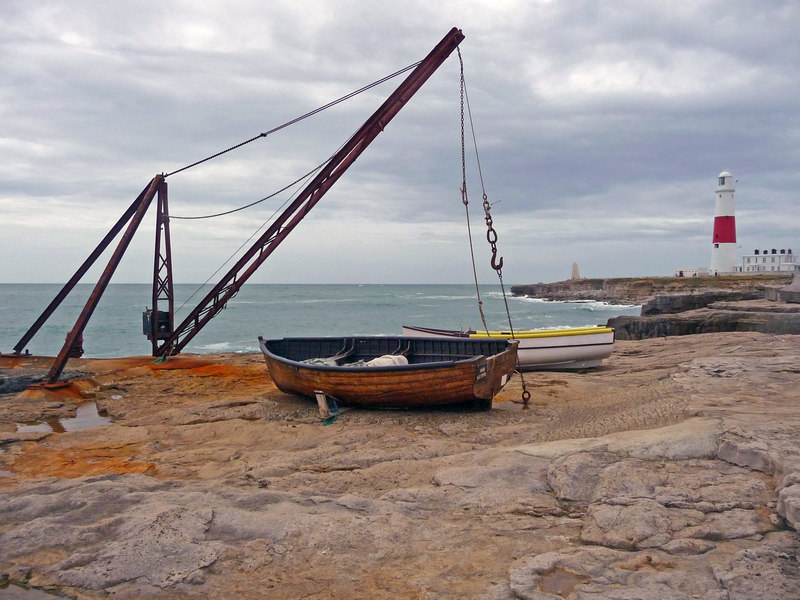
Red Crane

Red Crane is a crane on the Isle of Portland, Dorset, England. It is located on the cliff edge at Portland's southerly point, the promontory Portland Bill. It is part of a disused stone loading quay, which is now a scheduled monument.

== History ==
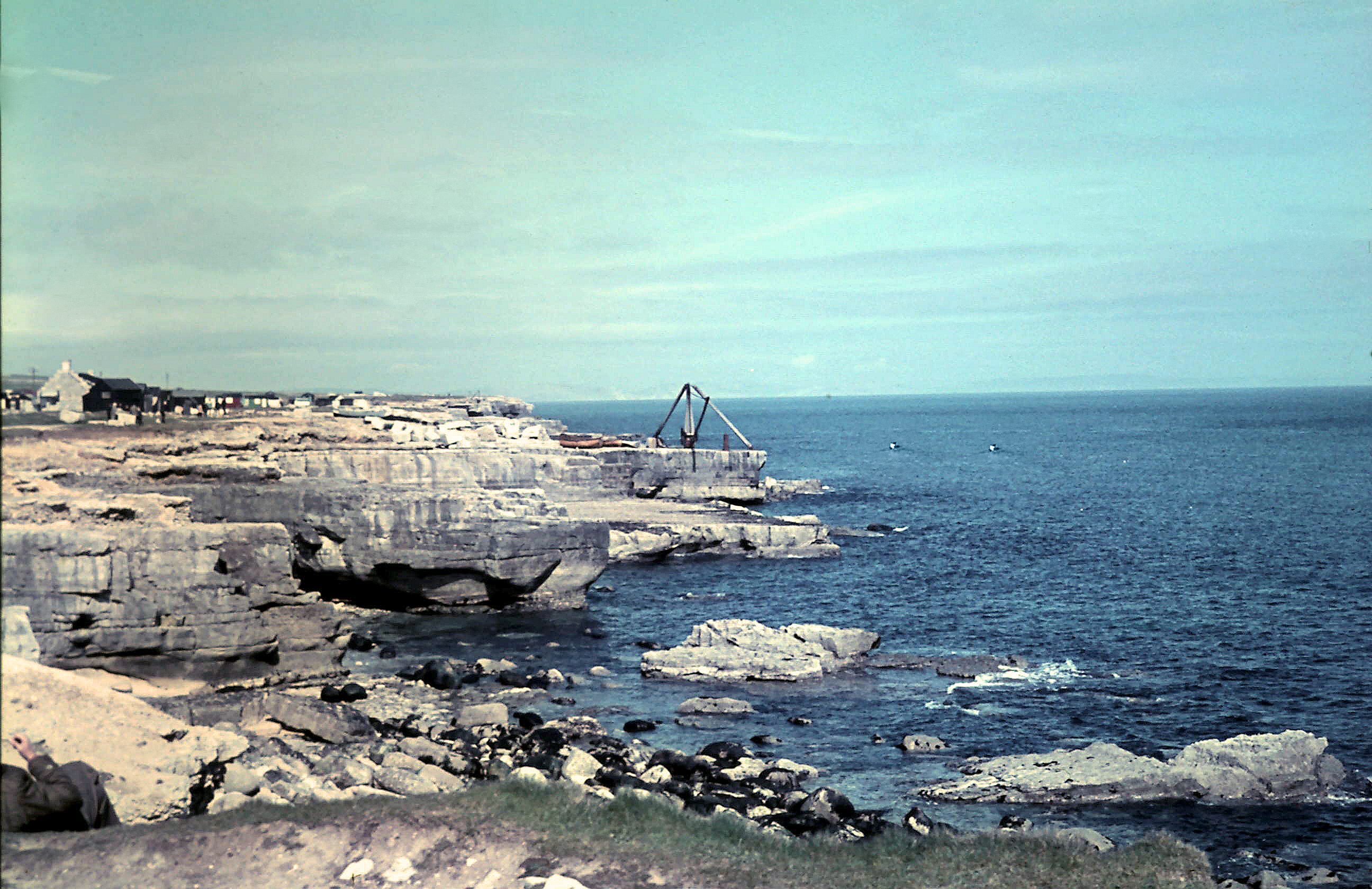
The original wooden Red Crane in 1962.

The area of Portland Bill had been quarried during the 19th century and continued until the early 20th century. During its commercial years, the stone shipping quay was created as the Bill's prime quay to ship Portland stone off the island. A hand-operated wooden crane was originally erected there for this purpose.

After quarrying ceased in the area in the early 20th century, the quay's crane, which became known as Red Crane, was used to lower fisherman and their boats into the sea. The crane was later replaced by a steel crane, which remains in place today. It continues to be used by fishermen. A similar crane, also steel, is the Broad Ope Crane (also known as Bob's Crane), which is located further north along Portland's east coastline, near Cave Hole. Sandholes Crane, further north of Broad Ope, is a surviving wooden crane.

== Gallery ==
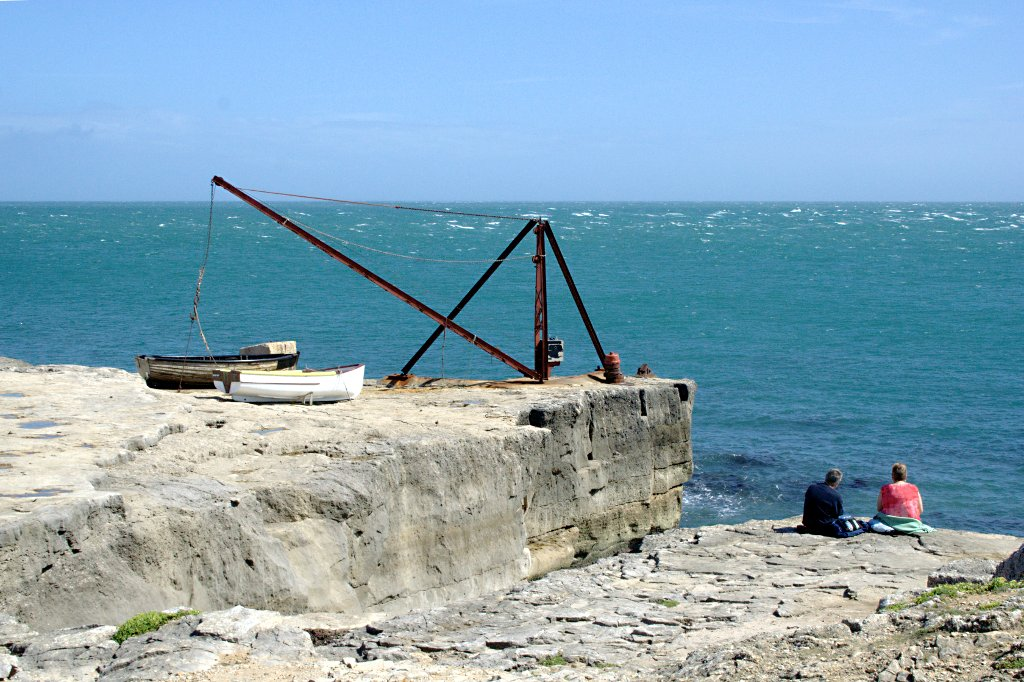
Red Crane

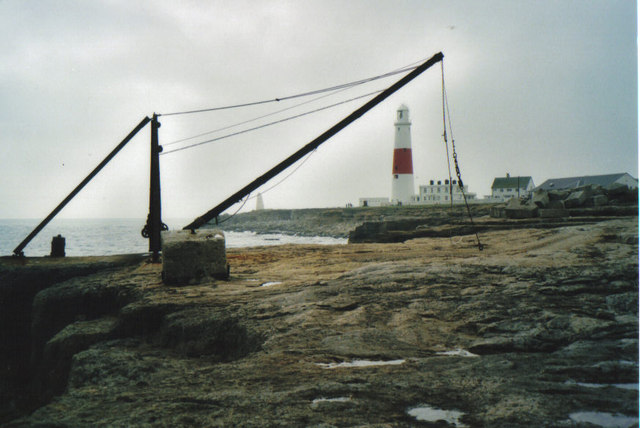
Red Crane with Portland Bill Lighthouse in the background.

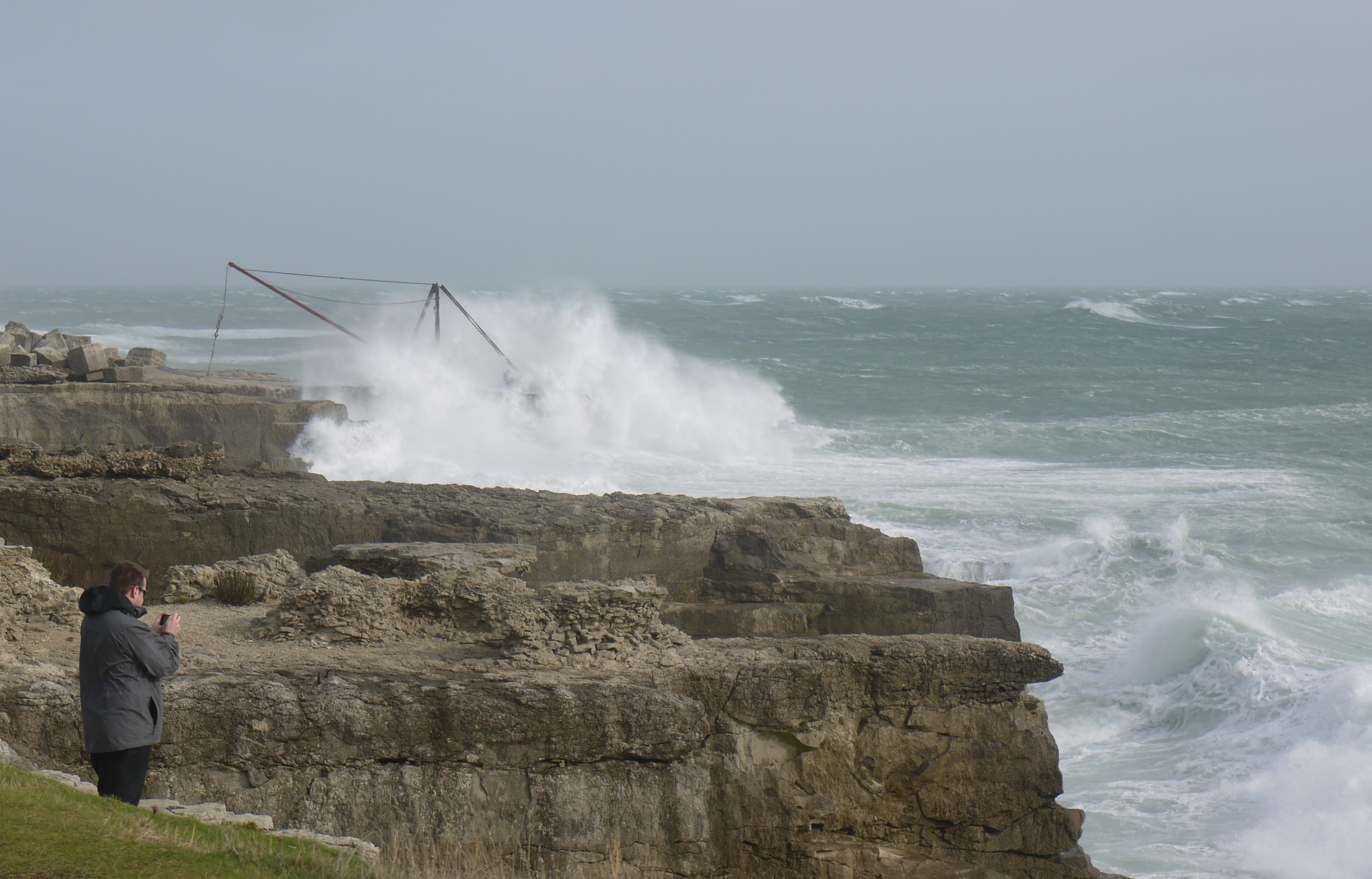
Red Crane during Storm St Jude of 2013.

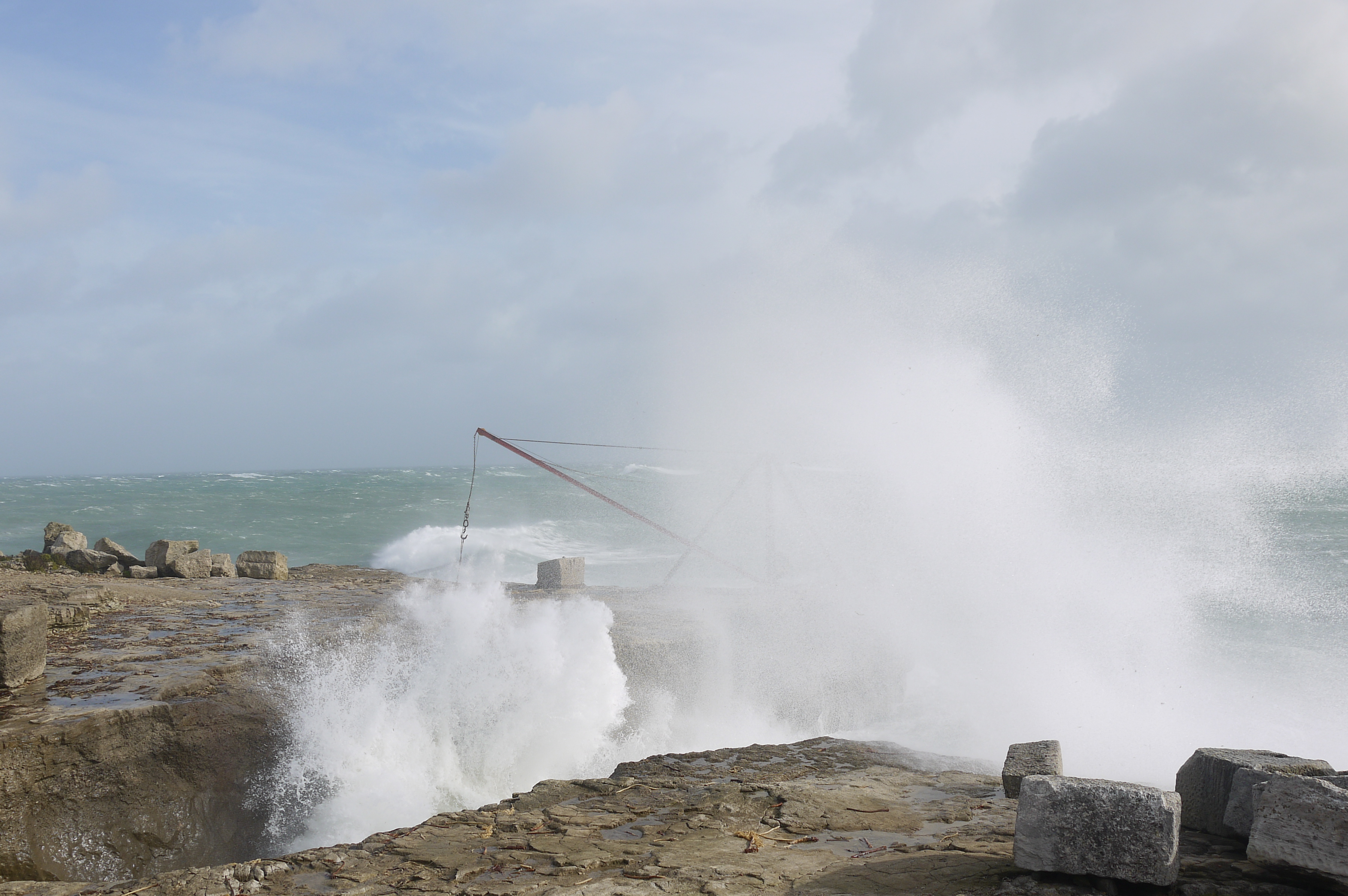
Red Crane's active Blow Hole during Storm St Jude of 2013.
