= NCI Portland Bill =

Coordinates: 50.5217°N 2.4573°W

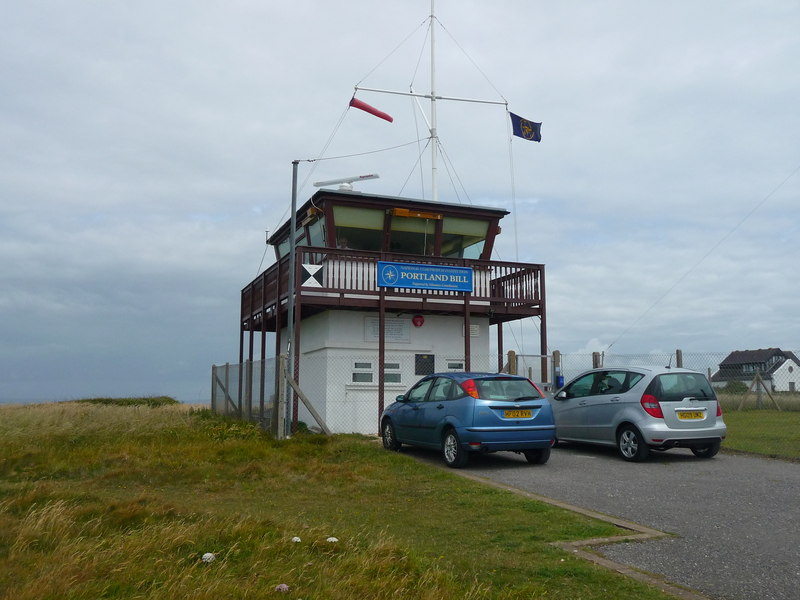
NCI Portland Bill in 2011.

NCI Portland Bill is a National Coastwatch Institution (NCI) lookout station on the Isle of Portland, Dorset, England. The station is situated 50 metres above sea level on the cliff edge, half a mile north of the tip of Portland Bill. It is located close to the Old Higher Lighthouse.

The coast of Portland Bill has been notorious for the many shipwrecks over the centuries. The dangerous coastline has proven more hazardous due to the strong tidal race known as the Portland Race. Portland Bill remains important as a way-point for coastal traffic.

== History ==
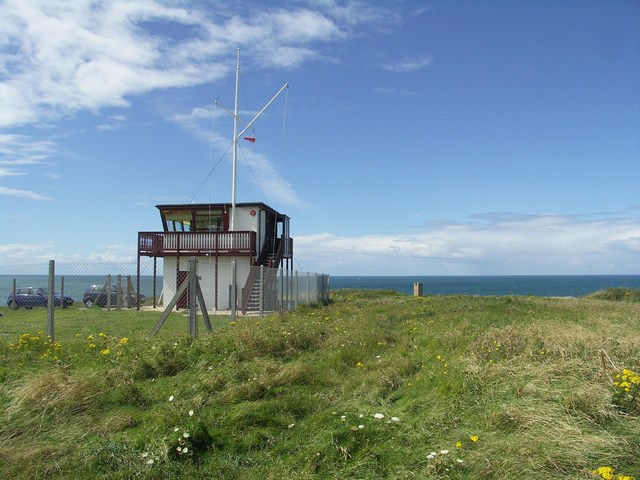
NCI Portland Bill in 2007.

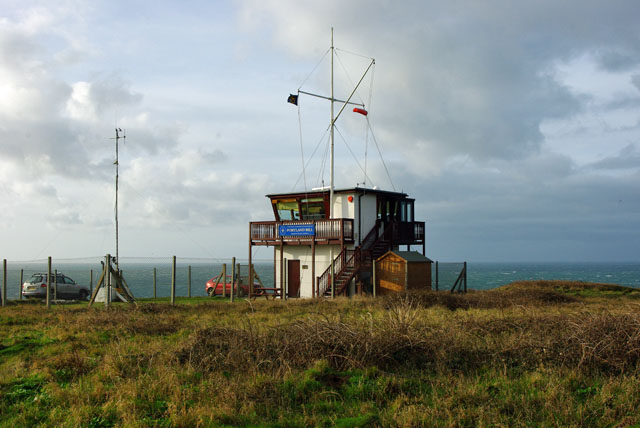
NCI Portland Bill in 2011.

The coastguard lookout at Portland Bill was first built in 1934. In 1994, HM Coastguard stations across the UK were shut down by the government in effort to save costs, though Portland Bill was one of the last lookouts to close as the station was considered to be vital due to the treacherous sea area.

Shortly after the coastguard stations were closed a group of mariners, led by Captain Starling Lark, formed a group to re-open them, following the deaths of two young fishermen directly in front of the lookout at Bass Point in Cornwall. However, by the time the Portland Bill lookout was chosen to be reopened, it was in desperate need of repair. In May 1996 a small band of enthusiasts, led by the first Station Manager Dave Crabb, undertook the task of refurbishing the station. The initial refurbishment was completed by early 1997, and on 27 May 1997 the station was declared officially open.

Despite the refurbishment the station was still inadequate, with only enough room for 2 watchkeepers. After a large fundraising campaign, started by the station manager Geoff Peters, it was rebuilt in 2004, and the watch room was extended to almost twice its original size. The recommencing of operations within the newly rebuilt station, on 27 July 2004, was marked with a service of blessing conducted by the Reverend Anita Thorne, which was attended by 100 guests. Whiskey Bravo (the Coastguard SAR Helicopter) also flew past in honour of the occasion. The official opening was carried out soon after by The Princess Royal.

In 2012, the station opened a recently built training centre as part of the station, which was funded entirely by donations. With the announcement of the HM Coastguard moving away from Weymouth, the training centre was built to replace the training facility used by the station at Weymouth and Portland Coastguard Headquarters.

== Operational details ==
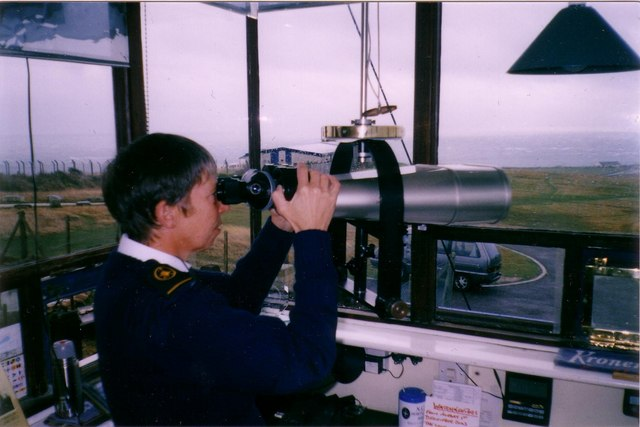
A watchkeeper inside the lookout station in 2003, before it was rebuilt.

The station is equipped with all the very latest technology, including radar, an AIS (Automatic Identification System) for identifying shipping, a weather monitoring system and high powered binoculars. In early 2012 a CCTV camera was installed at the top of Portland Bill Lighthouse to allow the station to monitor the inshore passage around the Bill, which was unable to be seen from the lookout. In 2013, the station logged 15,962 vessels, with involvement in over 160 incidents.

The lookout is run entirely on public donations, and this is partly achieved with local fundraising. The lookout costs £8,000 a year to keep active. It is staffed in four hour shifts, usually by 3 watchkeepers, from 07:00–19:00, 364 days each year. The station has 65 highly trained volunteers of all ages and backgrounds. Overall, the team donate 9,417 work-hours to the community each year, which excludes time 'on call', as well as administration work and training.

The station is officially part of the Dorset Search and Rescue, also working with HM Coastguards, the Search and Rescue Helicopter, the RNLI, UK Border Agencies, Immigration, Drug Alliance, Dorset Police, and the Marine Police. Additionally the station gives regular weather reports to HM Coastguards at Weymouth.

== Awards ==
In 2009 NCI Portland Bill was the winner of The Wessex Charity Award (Volunteers of the year). This award had 200 applicants. Following the recognition, Meridian Television created a 10-minute feature at the lookout, and this was screened throughout the region then sold to Westward Television. During the Queen's Diamond Jubilee year (2012), the station was presented with The Queen's Award for Voluntary Service - the highest recognition possible for volunteers, and the equivalent of an MBE. That same year in August the Princess Royal returned, together with Vice Admiral Sir Tim Laurence, to present the prestigious award. Following their appearance, both the Princess and Vice Admiral wrote letters to the station, and officially joined the team at Portland Bill by becoming Honorary Watchkeepers.
