= Old Lower Lighthouse =

Old Lower Lighthouse Portland Bill Low
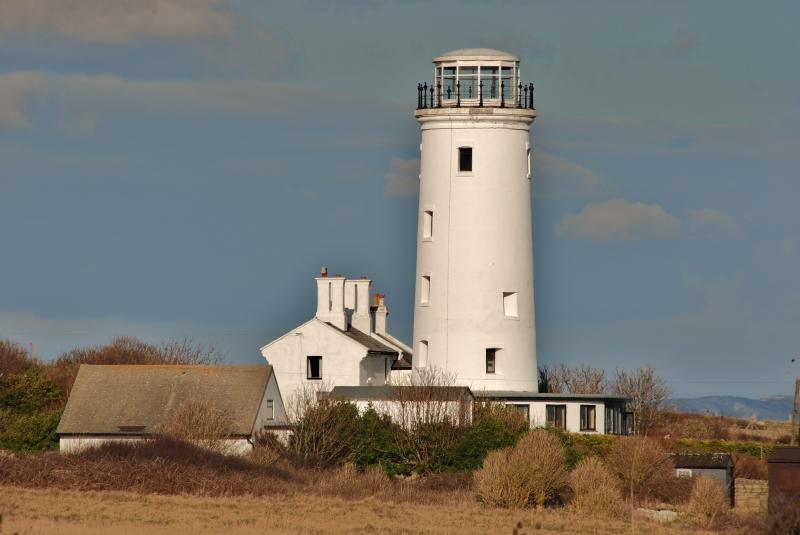
- The Old Lower Lighthouse in 2009
- Location: Isle of Portland; Dorset; England
- OS grid: SY6811768973
- Coordinates: 50.519687°N 2.451061°W

Tower
- Constructed: 1716 (first); 1759 (second)
- Construction: stone tower
- Height: 25 metres (82 ft)
- Shape: cylindrical tower with balcony and lantern attached to a 2-storey building
- Markings: white tower and lantern
- Operator: Portland Bird Observatory and Field Centre
- Heritage: Grade II listed building

Light
- First lit: 1869 (current)
- Deactivated: 1906
- Lens: 1st-order catadioptric fixed

The Old Lower Lighthouse is a disused 19th century lighthouse on the Isle of Portland, Dorset, southern England. It is located along the eastern side of Portland Bill. The lighthouse, including its boundary walls and coastguard house, became Grade II Listed in September 1978.

Working alongside the Old Higher Lighthouse from 1716, the lower lighthouse has subsequently been rebuilt twice, once in 1789 (when it became the first working lighthouse to have its light intensified by lenses and again in 1869. The lighthouse seen today was built in 1869 and has been the home of the Portland Bird Observatory since 1961.

== History ==
=== Original operation as a lighthouse ===
The surrounding coast of Portland, namely Portland Bill and Chesil Beach, have been notorious for the many vessels that became shipwrecked in the area over the centuries. After years of local petitions to Trinity House, the organisation agreed for a lighthouse to be built at Portland Bill. George I granted the patent in 1716. That year it was announced that Trinity House had 'caus'd to be erected two round Light-Houses of Stone upon Portland, in the County of Dorset, distant about two Thirds of a Mile from the Bill of Portland'. The Old Higher Lighthouse was built at Branscombe Hill, and the other on lower land. Designed as leading lights to guide ships between Portland Race and the Shambles sandbank, they shone out for the first time on 29 September 1716. Initially, both were fire lights. Although they had been privately built, Trinity House took over responsibility for the lights on finding them poorly maintained, in 1752.

In 1789, Trinity House hired the Weymouth builder William Johns to demolish and rebuild the lower lighthouse. The new lighthouse, 63 feet high and built of Portland stone, was then installed with six Argand lights and spherical reflectors, together with a new lens system created by Thomas Rogers. (Rogers had been experimenting with incorporating lenses into the windows of lighthouse lanterns, and this was the first time that his lenses had been installed in a practical setting. Though they only remained in place for a few years, they represent the beginning of something that would later become standard practice: the application of dioptric technology to a lighthouse.

In 1824 the lights in both towers were renewed and improved by Trinity House; whilst the High Light was made revolving at this time, the Lower Light remained stationary but with 'its power and magnitude [...] considerably increased'. In 1869 Trinity House had both lighthouses rebuilt to allow for further improvements to be made; at the same time they were each provided with a large (first-order) fixed optic, designed and built by James Chance.

At the turn of the 20th century, Trinity House made plans to build a new lighthouse at Bill Point to replace both current lighthouses. The new lighthouse was completed in 1905, and the original two lighthouses were then auctioned.

=== Establishment of bird observatory ===
During the Great War the lighthouse was the "Longstone Ope Tea Gardens". The lighthouse then saw several ownership changes, and was used as a family home for some of this time. After World War II, the lighthouse was empty and derelict.

During the 1950s, the studying of bird migration was becoming established on Portland. Many ornithologists were visiting the island and Portland Bill. Through the generosity of Miss Helen Brotherton and her family, the ornithologists were able to make the lighthouse their permanent base. In March 1961 the conversion and repair work had been completed, and the observatory was officially opened by Sir Peter Scott, as Portland's Bird Observatory and Field Centre. The observatory later became a registered charity. It caters for naturalists of all persuasions and offers hostel-style accommodation.

== See also ==
- List of lighthouses in England
