= Gorleston South Pier Lighthouse =

Lighthouse on the east coast of England

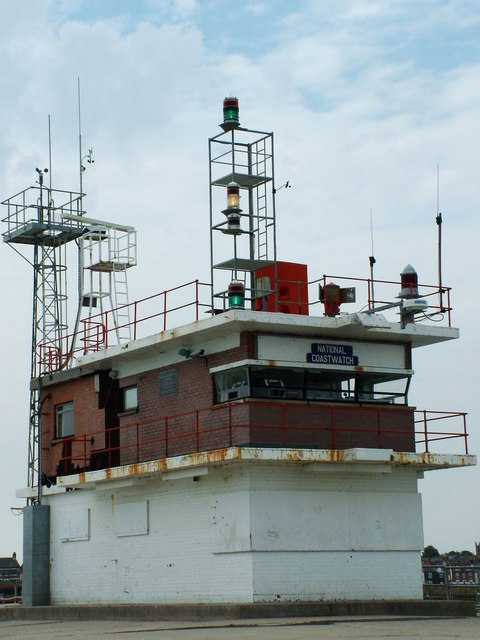
- Gorleston South Pier Lighthouse and Coastwatch station.
- Location: Gorleston; Norfolk; England
- Coordinates: 52.572128°N 1.738036°E

Tower
- Constructed: 1852 (first)
- Construction: brick and concrete building
- Height: 8 metres (26 ft)
- Shape: 2-storey building with two balconies and light on the roof
- Markings: white lower part, unpainted brick upper part
- Power source: mains electricity
- Operator: National Coastwatch Institution
- Fog signal: 3 blasts every 60s.

Light
- First lit: 1955 (current)
- Focal height: 11 metres (36 ft)
- Range: 11 nautical miles (20 km; 13 mi)
- Characteristic: Fl R 3s.

Gorleston South Pier Lighthouse and Coastwatch watch station is located in the town of Gorleston in the English county of Norfolk. The lighthouse and station is located at the end of the south pier of seaport on the south side of Great Yarmouth.

== History ==
The first lighthouse was established here in 1852 was an octagonal brick tower of similar height to the present lighthouse building. The building today was built in 1955 and was also the harbourmaster's office, later re-located.

== Operation ==
The light of today is mounted on the roof along with communications equipment, harbour control lights, and the fog horn that when used, sounds three blasts every 60 seconds. The lighthouse is operated by the Great Yarmouth Port Authority. The watchtower is now home to the Gorleston Branch of the National Coastwatch Institution which has over 60 Volunteer members and act as the eyes and ears of HM Coast Guard. The crew watches from 0800hrs to 2000hrs in the summer (March to October) and 0800hrs to 1600hrs in the winter. (October to March)

== See also ==
- List of lighthouses in England
