= Rossall Point Observation Tower =

Observation tower in Fleetwood, England

Coordinates: 53.9228°N 3.0445°W

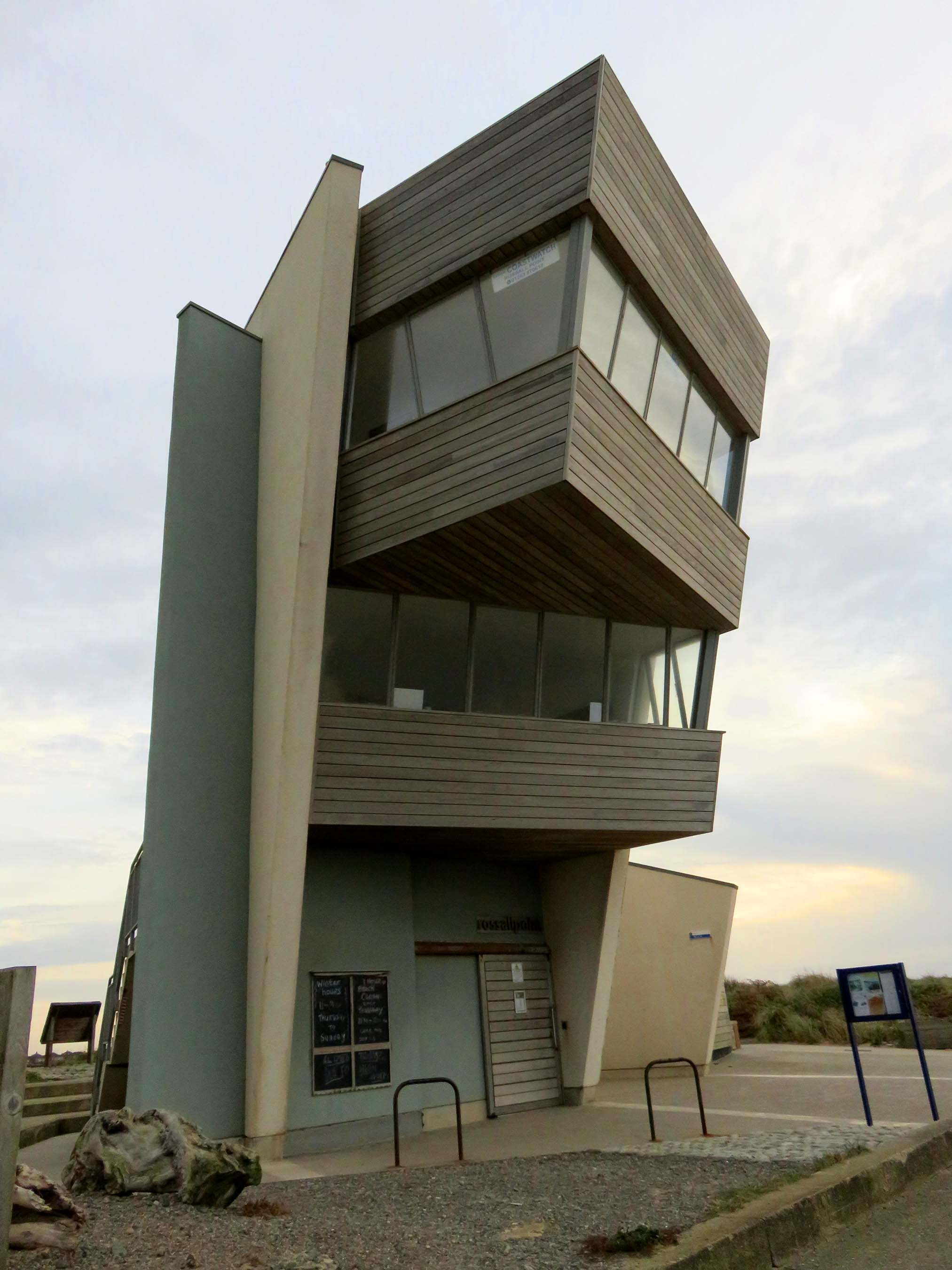
Rossall Point Observation Tower

Rossall Point Observation Tower is an observation tower in Fleetwood, Lancashire, England. The four-storey 46-foot-high (14 m) tower was completed in March 2013. It is also used as a beacon and was designed by Studio Three Architects.

Located on the sand dunes between Cleveleys and Fleetwood, the tower's second floor is a base for the National Coastwatch Institution and its top level provides an open observation deck on its top level for the general public and bird watchers. With views over the Lakeland fells out across Morecambe Bay and the Irish Sea, it is part of Wyre Council's project Sea Change, a £2.1 million redevelopment product. It provides a 360° panorama.

The four-storey tower replaces the old observation tower which was no longer fit for purpose. The older tower was a coastguard tower built in 1948 which also provided a public viewing platform. In December 2011, the Orange mast next to the tower was removed. The roof of the old tower (viewing platform) was moved in early 2012 and the remains of the tower were converted into a toilet. Work on the new tower officially began in February 2012.

The ground floor gallery is used as an education facility by Wyre Council's Coast and Countryside Rangers. A camera at the top of the tower shows pictures which are then shown on a screen in the education facility for those unable to climb to the top floor.

Councillor Gordon McCann, cabinet member with responsibility for economic development at Wyre Council, called the tower "distinctive" with "stunning" "views".

It is one of two observation towers with views over the Lancashire coastline, alongside Blackpool Tower; formerly, Morecambe was home to Morecambe Tower and the Polo Tower.
