= Cave Hole, Portland =

English cave

Coordinates: 50.5198°N 2.4446°W

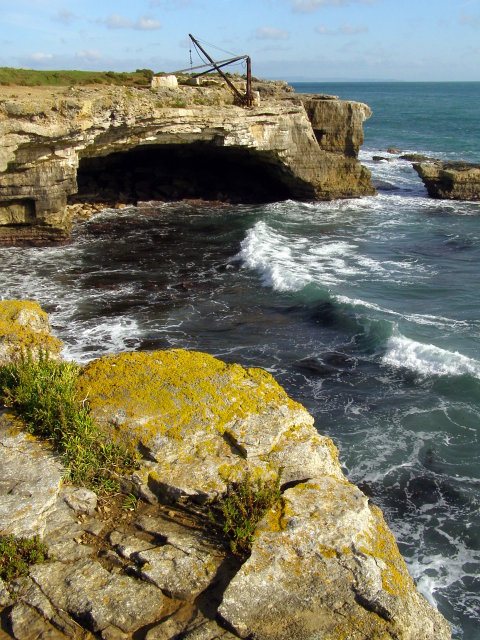
Cave Hole and the Broad Ope Crane.

Cave Hole is a large cave on the south east side of the Isle of Portland, a large peninsular in Dorset, England. It has a blowhole and a wooden crane, known as Broad Ope Crane on the cliff top. It is 1/2 mile (800 m) north-east of Portland Bill, has an interior measuring 50 feet (15 m) square and 21 feet (6.4 m) high.

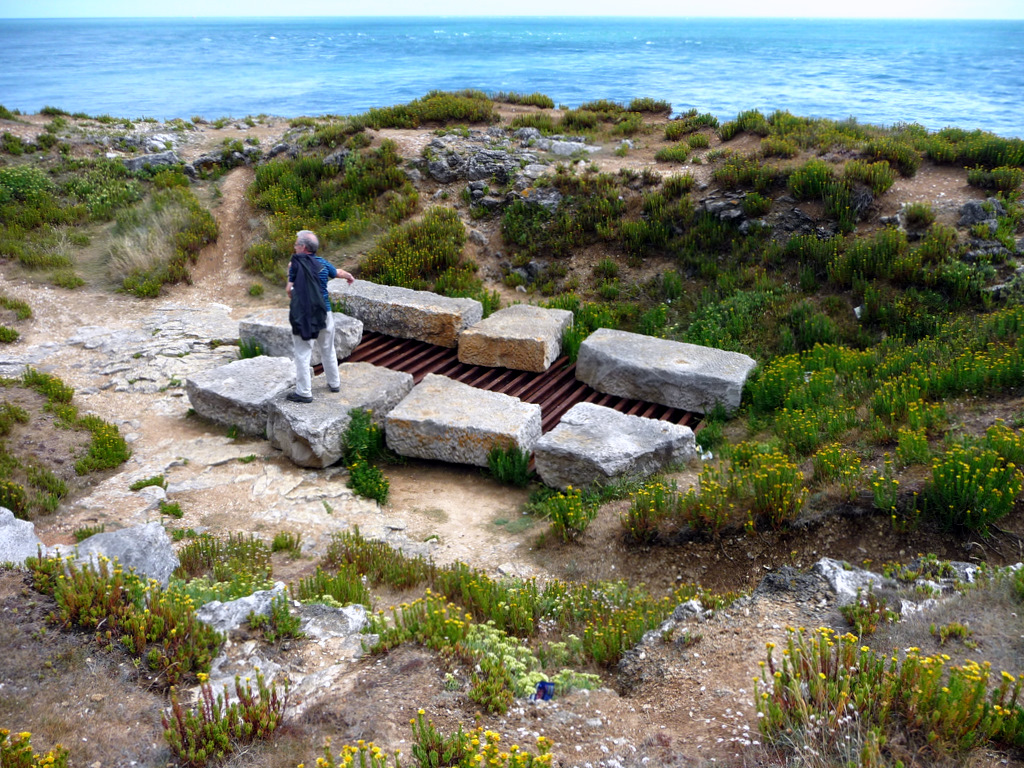
The Blow Hole of Cave Hole.

Cave Hole was earlier known as Keeve's Hole and regularly featured in recorded history and wider lore of smuggling. It is made up of a series of caves with steep roof sections, tunnels and ledges, and represents the first stage in cave collapse. The cave and its surrounding area is frequently used for deep-water soloing. The cave's blowhole, which stretches far into the solid rock, was formed when the roof of the cave was broken through to the surface. For the protection of people looking down into the cave, an iron grill has been installed across it. Whenever a powerful easterly gale occurs, the sea shoots up through the fissures.

Various small craft have been driven into the cave by east and south easterly gales, the largest of which was a 40-ton vessel from Cowes in 1780. Frank and Ann Davison were shipwrecked at the cave in 1949. The pair had set sail for the West Indies. Frank drowned but Ann managed to scramble ashore. A local tale has long reputed that the cave is home to the Roy Dog - a black dog, "as high as man, with large fiery eyes, one green, one red". It is said that the creature emerges from the watery depths to seize any traveller passing by Cave Hole and drags them down into his dark watery domain.
