= National Coastwatch Institution =

Voluntary organisation of marine observatories

The National Coastwatch Institution's logo

The National Coastwatch Institution is a voluntary organisation and registered charity, providing a visual watch along the UK's coasts, and is not to be confused with HM Coastguard.

== History ==
The National Coastwatch Institution (NCI) was founded in Cornwall in 1994 following the deaths of two local fishermen whose boat sank within sight of a then recently closed coastguard station at Bass Point. Most of HM Coastguard's visual watch stations were closed following a period of rationalisation and modernisation. Although never fully admitted or responsibility accepted by the Maritime and Coastguard Agency or HM Government, it was speculated within the local community that were the watch keepers' station still staffed then the fishermen in distress would have been spotted and assistance sent. Therefore the institution became established from a campaign to re-establish a visual coastal watch in Cornwall. The first NCI Coastwatch station was thus established at Bass Point, on The Lizard Peninsula, Cornwall, by November 1994.

Following the successful launch of NCI Bass Point, other stations quickly followed in Devon, Cornwall, East Anglia, Somerset, Sussex, Essex, Dorset, and South Wales. As of December 2023, there are 60 NCI stations operational around the coast of England and Wales, from Fleetwood in the Northwest, through Wales, along the south coast, and up the east coast to Filey, North Yorkshire with over 2,740 trained volunteer watchkeepers.

The Institution has a joint Memorandum of Understanding with the Maritime and Coastguard Agency (MCA), and more recently UK's Border Force, and this outlines the NCI's role and provides the basis for the working relationship between the Institution and these departments. Most NCI stations have acquired, or are working towards acquiring, "declared facility status", giving those NCI stations potential to participate in active operations of the UK's search and rescue organisations. Many have also achieved the Queen's Award for Voluntary Service (QAVS) and, in 2023, NCI Newhaven was awarded the King's Award for Voluntary Service (KAVS).

== Work ==
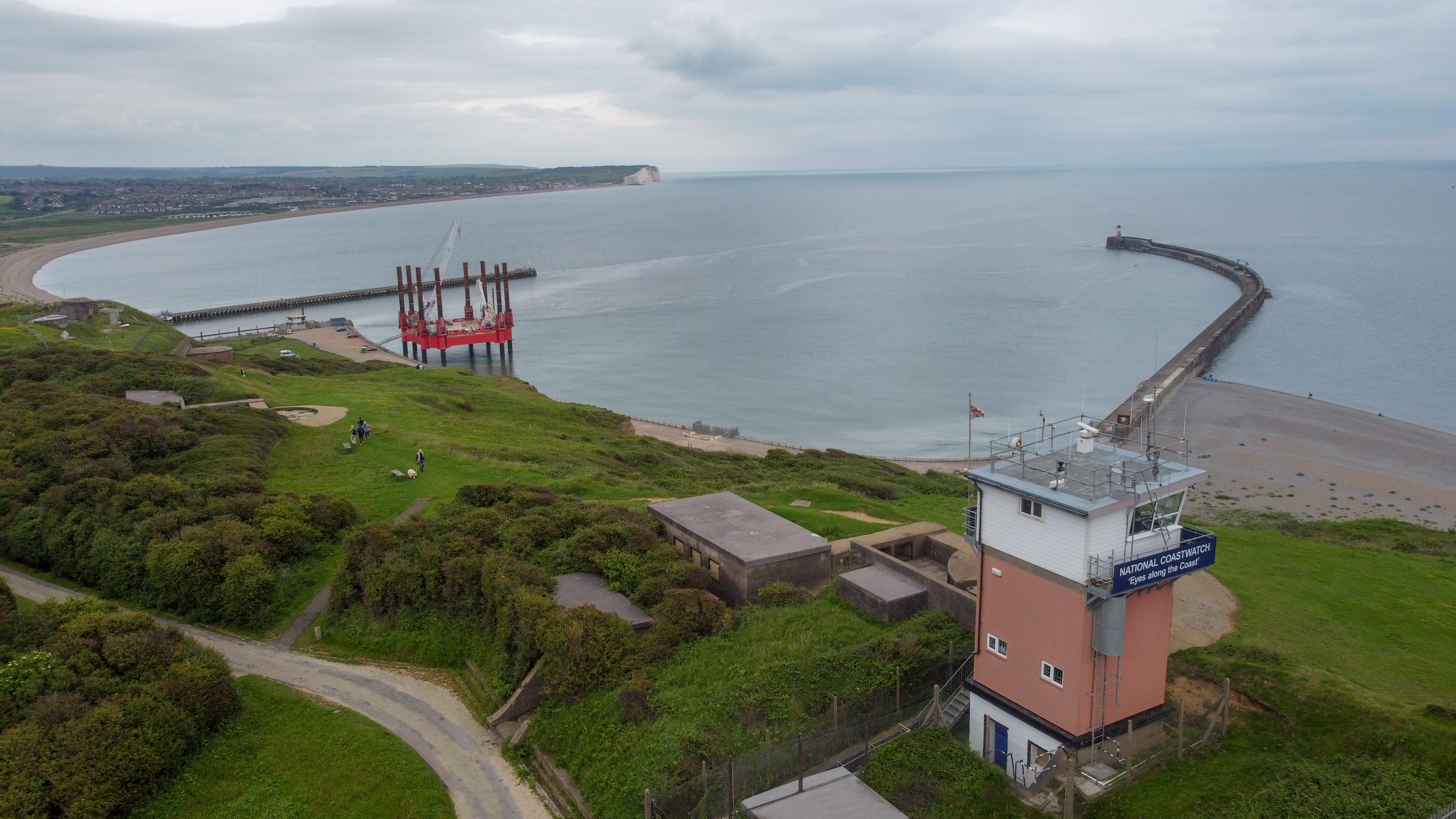
Newhaven NCI lookout and the area it keeps watch on

As of December 2023, the NCI's 2,740-plus uniformed trained volunteer watchkeepers maintain a visual watch along part of the UK coastline with 60 established NCI watch stations. These stations provide a daily visual watch in all weathers, monitoring marine radio channels, sea conditions and weather, using radar and providing a listening watch in poor visibility. All emergencies are reported to the appropriate authorities for action, the majority of NCI work being working mainly with HM Coastguard and other statutory authorities. Most NCI stations are staffed on a daily basis providing a regular daily watch from 8:00 am to dusk. In 2022 a total of 274,543-person-hours watch was performed by NCI watchkeepers, recording over 222,458 commercial, military and leisure vessel movements, and reporting a total of 826 incidents to HM Coastguard, fire, police and ambulance services, of which 336 were NCI-initiated lifeboat rescues. All this work was carried out at no cost to the public purse.

All volunteers are provided with training in visual observation techniques, marine chart-work, Ordnance Survey mapping, critical reporting, marine radio procedures, and radar, ensuring all volunteers reach the standards expected by the Maritime and Coastguard Agency.

The NCI works with HM Coastguard, the MCA, the RNLI and the other emergency services. In 2023, some of the 852 incidents reported by NCI to the MCA ended with the call-out of the RNLI lifeboats, RAF air-sea rescue, MoD ordnance units, fire, ambulance and other rescue agencies. These incidents included vessels sinking, vessels on fire, vessels in danger and distress, swimmers, surf boarders and kite boarders in difficulties, inflatable toys with children on board being blown out to sea, persons fallen over cliffs, persons washed off jetty, land fires, dangerous munitions washed up, personal injuries, and so on.

In addition, many hundreds of minor incidents were dealt with including informing the coastguard and police of lost, found and missing children, distressed marine wildlife, ordnance on beaches, chemical drums, large carcasses and dangerous debris washed up.

2019 saw the twenty fifth anniversary of the foundation of the National Coastwatch Institution. A national office is now open in Liskeard, Cornwall.

NCI contributes to SAR by maintaining a visual lookout (‘Spot, Plot, Report and Respond’) around the coastline.

All NCI stations have, or are working towards achieving, Declared Facility Status from the Maritime & Coastguard Agency. DFS outlines what MCA expect from NCI stations, this includes the training and skills watchkeepers are expected to have and what equipment lookouts are expected to have. For watchkeepers this includes but is not limited to, understanding VHF Mayday, Pan Pan & Securite and the associated procedures, communication protocols for working with SAR assets, observation techniques, plotting and chart work, understanding of emergency beacons and operation of AIS / radar terminals. For stations this includes but is not limited to high power binoculars, VHF Radios, nautical charts, AIS / radar and usually a weather station and CCTV system.

Once a station has achieved DFS it is listed as an asset within the Search and Rescue community.

== Structure and uniform ==
Top row: Rank structure and uniform insignia of the National Coastwatch Institution (NCI)Bottom row: Specialist roles and uniform insignia of the National Coastwatch Institution (NCI)
Chief; Officer	National; Trustee	Regional; Coordinator	Regional; Staff Officer	Station; Manager	Deputy Station; Manager	Station; Officer	Certified; Watchkeeper	Watchkeeping; Assistant	Member / Trainee
							Assessor	Assessment; Team Member (No longer issued)	Cadet

== Coastwatch stations ==
The National Coastwatch Institution maintains 61 operational Coastwatch stations around the coastline of England and Wales, at the following locations:

=== England ===
==== East coast ====
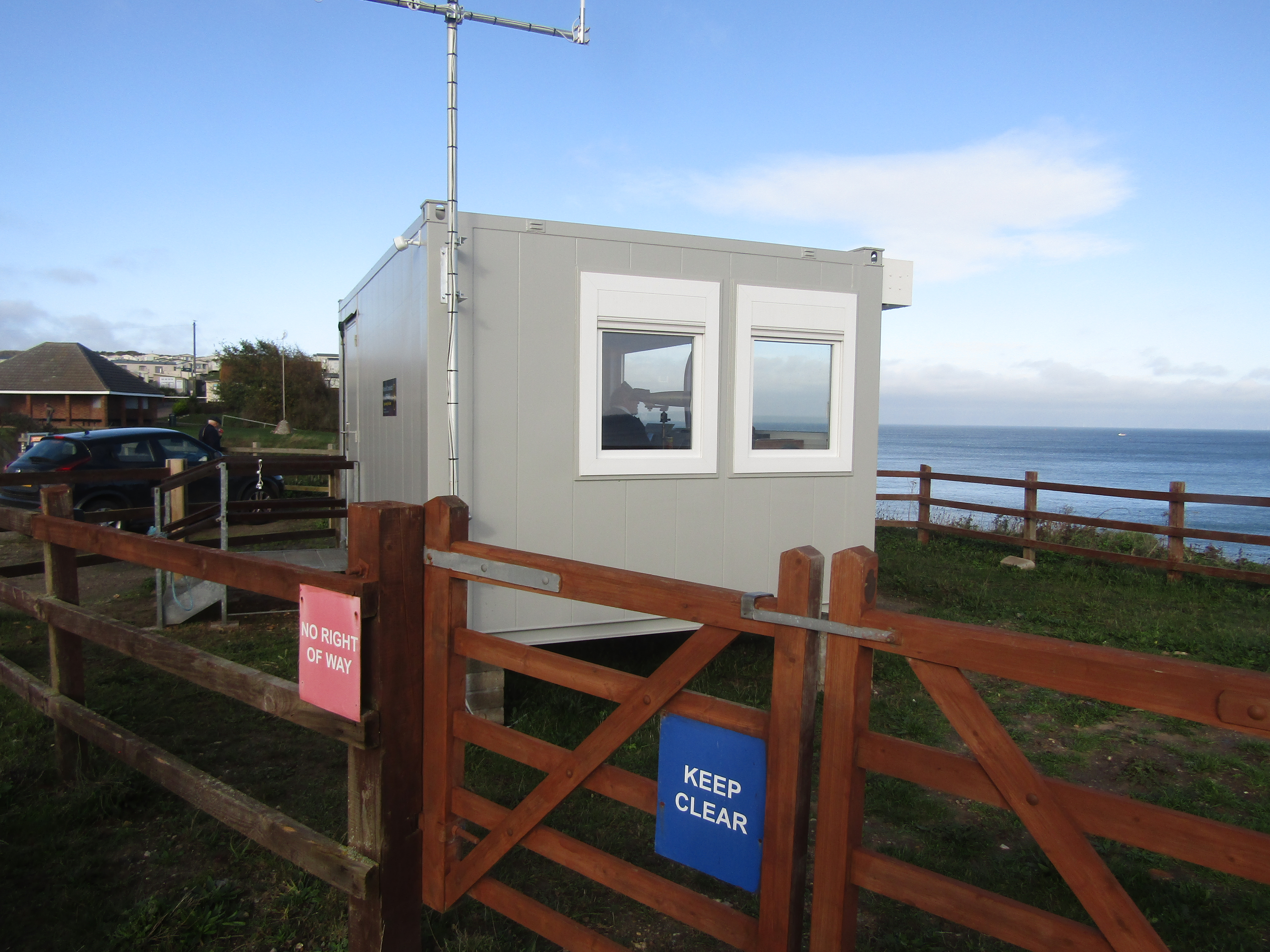
East Runton Coastwatch lookout post

- Brancaster, Norfolk
- Caister, Norfolk
- Chapel Point, Lincolnshire
- Cleethorpes, Lincolnshire
- East Runton, Cromer, Norfolk
- Felixstowe, Suffolk
- Filey, North Yorkshire
- Gorleston, Great Yarmouth
- Herne Bay, Kent
- Hornsea, East Yorkshire
- Canvey Island, Essex
- Jaywick, Jaywick Sands, Essex
- Mablethorpe QAVS, Lincolnshire
- Mundesley, Norfolk
- Pakefield, Suffolk
- Southend, Essex
- Sunderland VLB (affiliate), Tyne & Wear
- Skegness, Lincolnshire
- Wells-next-the-Sea, Norfolk
- Whitstable, Kent

==== South coast ====
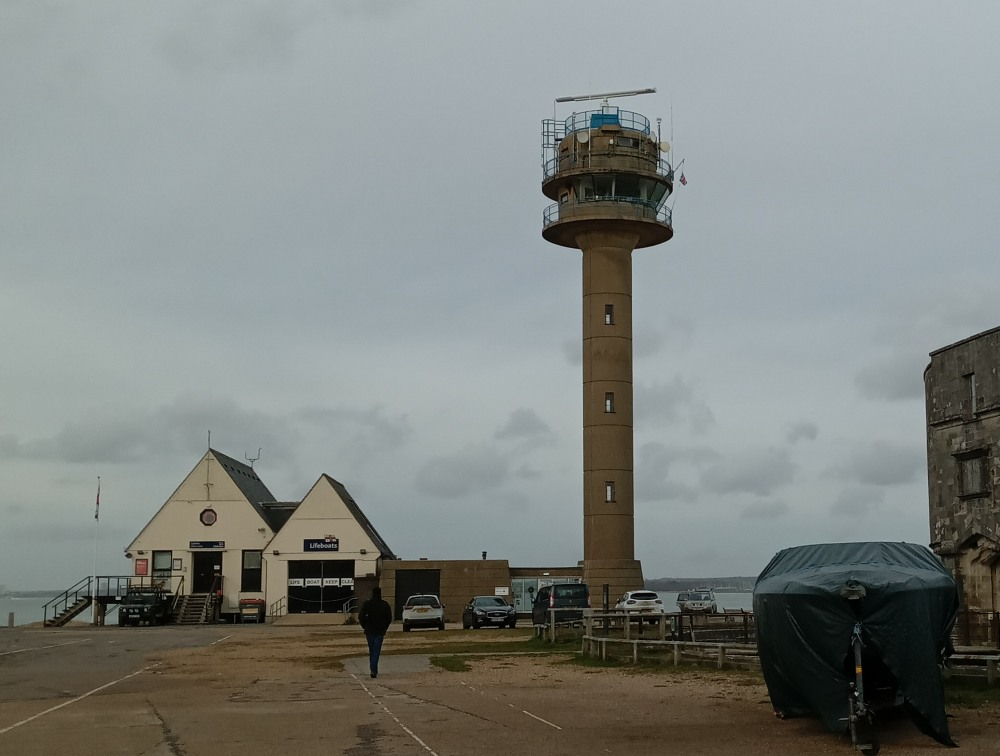
NCI Calshot Tower and RNLI Station

- Bembridge, Isle of Wight
- Calshot, Hampshire
- Folkestone, Kent
- Gosport, Hampshire
- The Needles and Alum Bay, Isle of Wight
- Lee-on-the-Solent, Hampshire
- Newhaven, East Sussex
- Shoreham, Sussex

==== West country ====
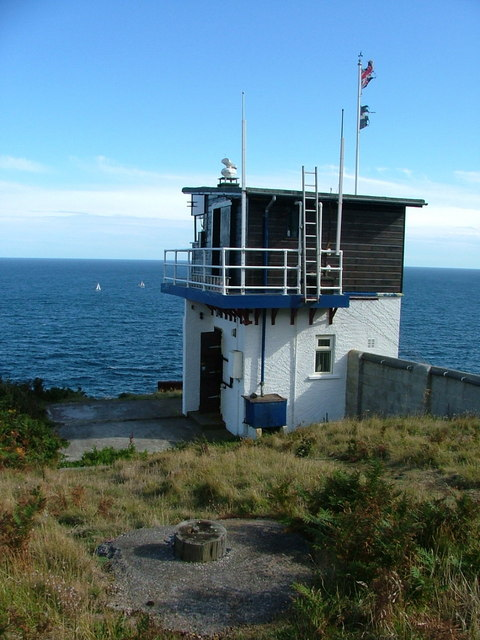
Bass Point Coastwatch station

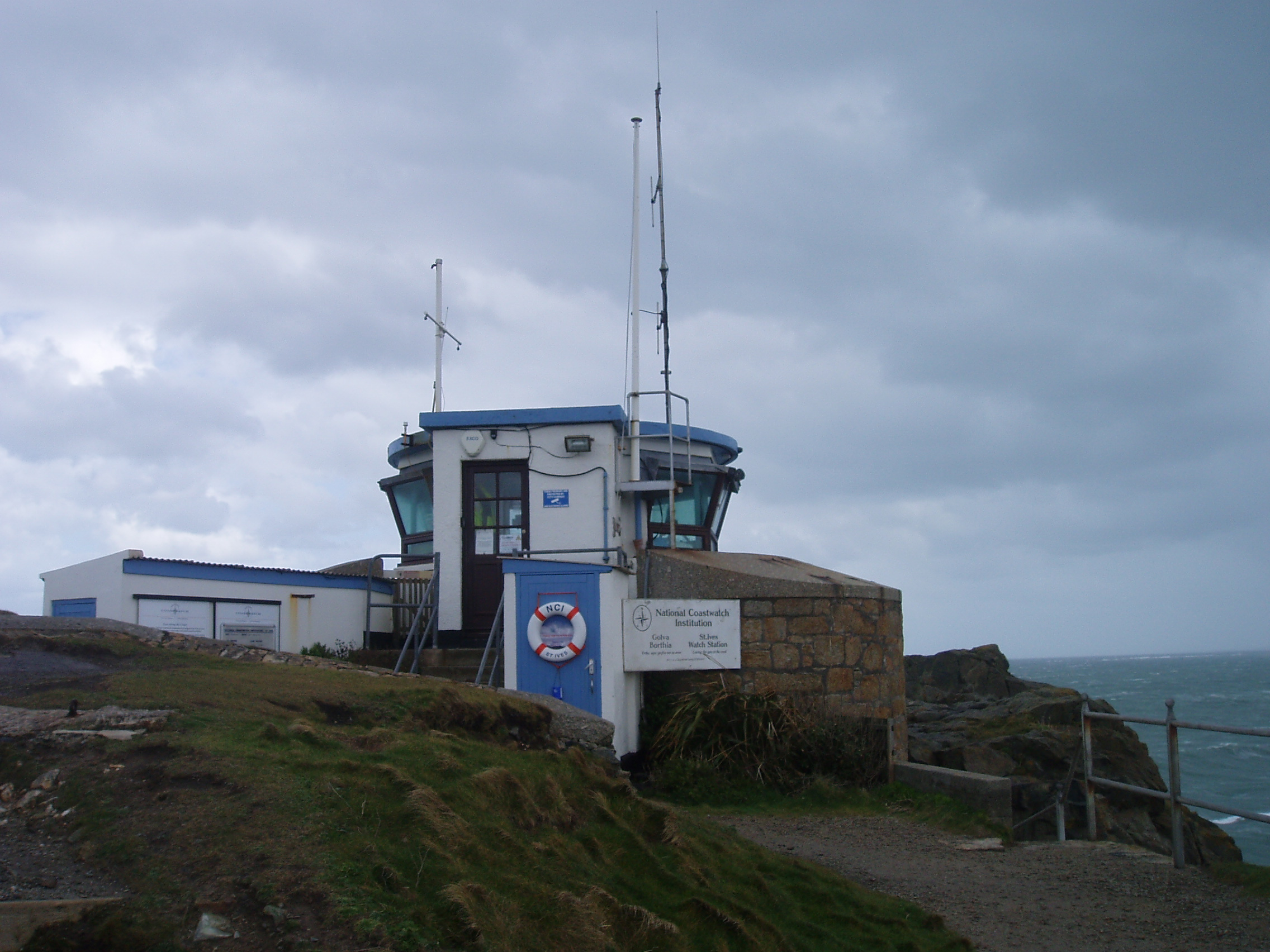
St Ives Coastwatch station

- Bass Point The Lizard, Cornwall
- Boscastle, Cornwall
- Cape Cornwall, St Just, Penzance, Cornwall
- Charlestown, St Austell, Cornwall
- Exmouth, Devon
- Froward Point, Devon
- Gwennap Head, St Levan, Cornwall
- Lyme Bay, Dorset
- Minehead, Somerset
- Nare Point, The Lizard, Helston, Cornwall
- Penzance, Cornwall
- Peveril Point, Swanage, Dorset
- Polruan, Cornwall
- Portland Bill, Dorset
- Portscatho, Pednvadan Point, Cornwall
- Prawle Point, Kingsbridge, Devon
- Rame Head, Cawsand, Cornwall
- St Agnes Head, Cornwall
- St Alban's Head, Worth Matravers
- Swanage, Dorset
- St Ives, Cornwall
- Stepper Point, Padstow, Cornwall
- Teignmouth, Devon
- Torbay, Devon

=== North west coast ===
- Fleetwood, Rossall Point, Lancashire

=== Wales ===
- Llandudno, North Wales
- Moelfre, Anglesey
- Nells Point, Barry Island, South Wales
- Porthcawl, Bridgend, South Wales
- Porthdinllaen, North Wales
- Rhoscolyn, Anglesey, Wales
- St Donat's Bay, Vale of Glamorgan, South Wales
- Wooltack Point, Pembrokeshire
- Worm's Head, Gower Peninsula, South Wales
