= Trinity House Obelisk =

Daymark at Portland Bill, UK

Coordinates: 50.5132°N 2.4567°W

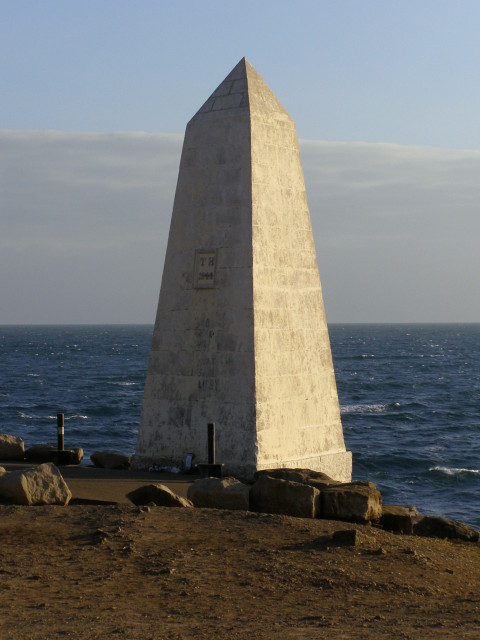
Trinity House Obelisk

The Trinity House Obelisk, also known as the Trinity House Landmark, is a 19th-century obelisk located at Portland Bill, on the Isle of Portland, Dorset, England. Built as a daymark, it has been Grade II Listed since 1978.

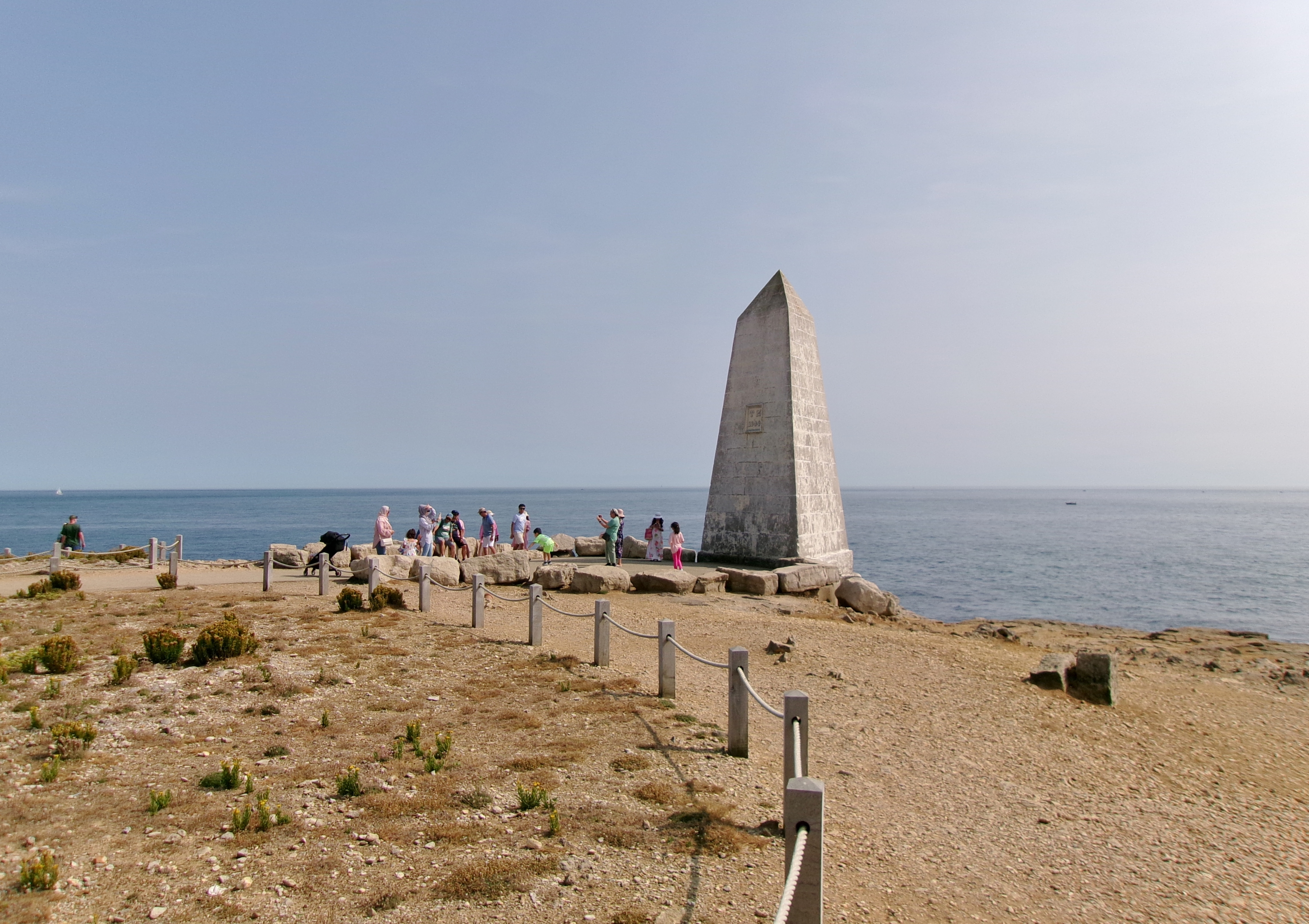
Tourists at the obelisk

The obelisk was built in 1844 to warn ships off the coast of Portland Bill. It stands at the southern tip of the Isle of Portland, acting as a warning of the low shelf of rock extending 30 metres south into the sea. The obelisk is made of Portland stone and is seven metres in height. It is inscribed "TH 1844" on its north face. The monument was saved from threatened demolition in 2002 after Trinity House deemed it too expensive to maintain.
