= Portland Bill =

Promontory in the isle of Portland in England

Coordinates: 50°30′52″N 2°27′26″W

Portland Bill

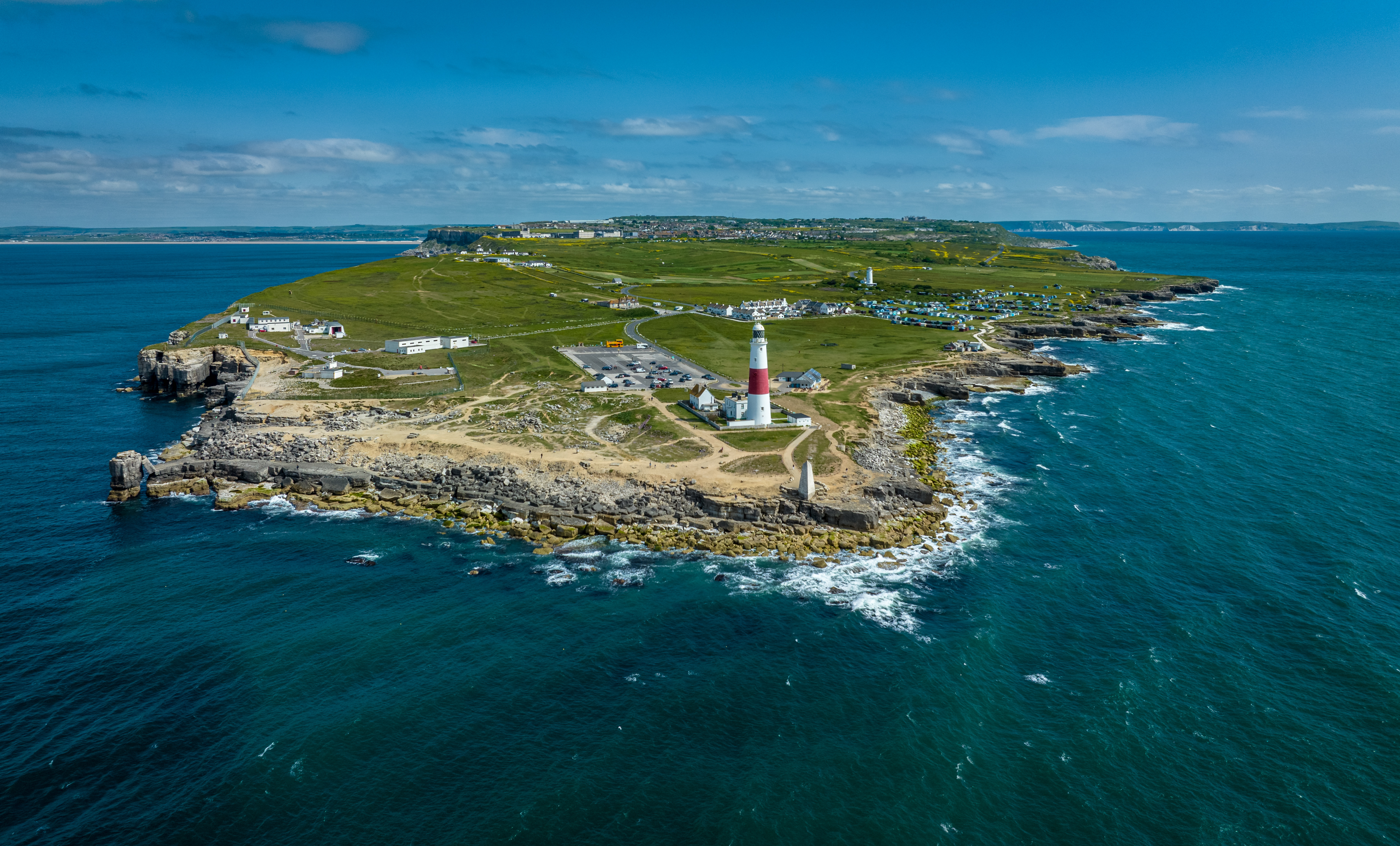
from the south

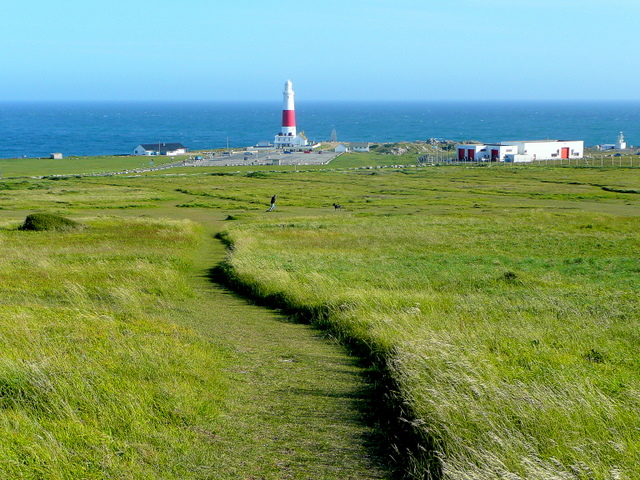
from the north

Portland Bill is a narrow promontory (or bill) at the southern end of the Isle of Portland, and the southernmost point of Dorset, England. One of Portland's most popular destinations is Portland Bill Lighthouse. Portland's coast has been notorious for the number of shipwrecked vessels over the centuries. The dangerous coastline features shallow reefs and the Shambles sandbank, made more hazardous due to the strong Portland tidal race.

The Bill is an important way-point for coastal traffic, and three lighthouses have been built to protect shipping. The original two worked as a pair from 1716, and they were replaced in 1906 by the current one.

== History ==
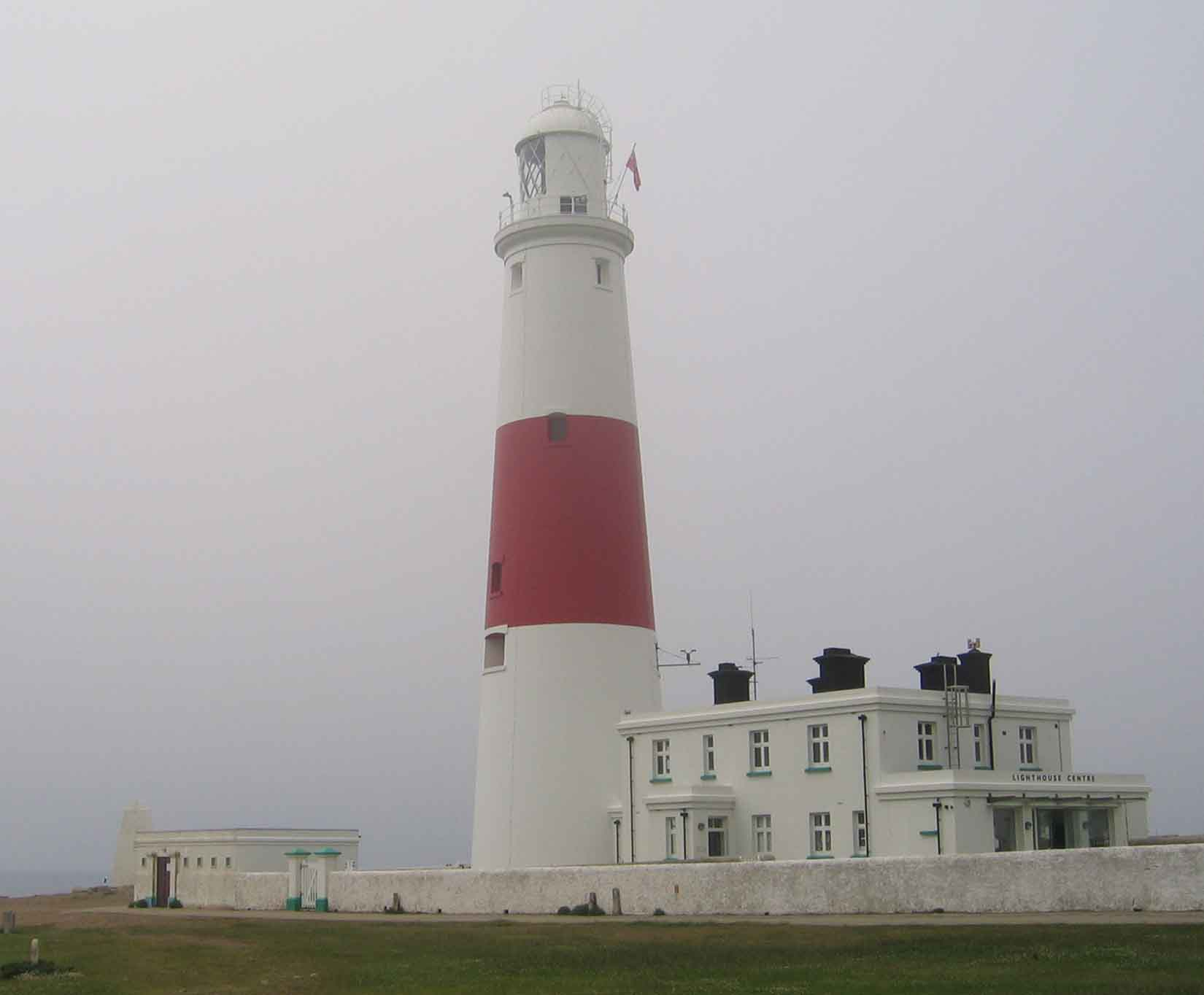
Portland Bill Lighthouse

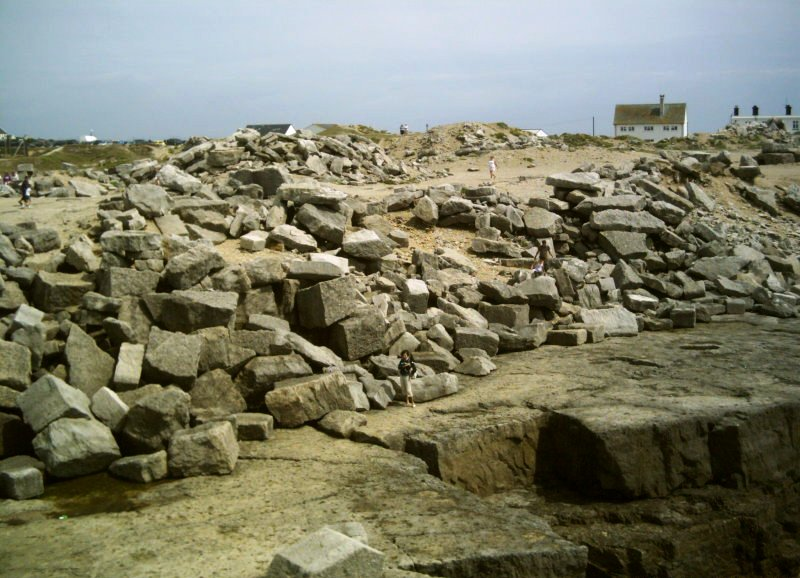
Piles of stone at Portland Bill from quarrying in the area

From Roman times, beacon fires were lit to warn ships of the danger of the Bill. A petition to Trinity House was put forward for a lighthouse in the early 18th century, but Trinity House opposed it. They later conceded that a lighthouse was needed and George I granted the patent on 26 May 1716. Trinity House issued a lease to William Barrett and Francis Browne to build and maintain one or more lighthouses.

One lighthouse was built at Branscombe Hill, while the other was situated on lower land nearer the coast. The two lighthouses were lit for the first time on 29 September 1716. The lights were poorly maintained, and Trinity House terminated the lease after an inspection in 1752. In 1789, the Old Lower Lighthouse was demolished and rebuilt. In 1844, Trinity House erected a stone obelisk at the southern tip of the Bill as a daymark, and the first lightship was placed at the Shambles sandbank in 1859. In 1869, Trinity House had both lighthouses rebuilt.

Pulpit Rock is an artificial stack of rock that was formed in the 1870s by quarrying operations at the Bill. At the turn of the 20th-century, Trinity House put forward plans for a new lighthouse which was completed in 1905 and first shone on 11 January 1906. The original two lighthouses were decommissioned and sold. The Old Lower Lighthouse later became a bird observatory in 1961. The Old Higher Lighthouse was owned by Marie Stopes from 1923 to 1958 and is now a holiday let. A proper road to Portland Bill was laid in 1922 and this helped the Bill become a tourist destination.

A coastguard lookout at Portland Bill was built in 1934. It closed in the 1990s but was taken over by the National Coastwatch Institution, which rebuilt the station in the 21st century. During the 1960s, the Ministry of Defence Magnetic Range was built at the Bill. Farther up the hill at Branscombe was a Royal Navy Wireless telegraphy station which was established in the early 20th century and closed in the 1990s. The Shambles lightship was permanently withdrawn in 1976 and replaced by automatic buoys. The current lighthouse was unmanned in 1996 and all monitoring and control transferred to the Trinity House Operations & Planning Centre in Harwich. The lighthouse has a visitor centre, while tours are conducted to take visitors to the top of the lighthouse.

LB&SCR H1 class 4-4-2 no. 38 (later no. B38, 2038, and 32038) was named Portland Bill after this landmark.

== Features ==
The lighthouses, Pulpit Rock and the Trinity House Obelisk are Portland Bill's key attractions. Close to the Ministry of Defence range at the Bill is Portland's main Raised Beach, and close to the Old Higher Lighthouse is NCI Portland Bill, a National Coastwatch Institution lookout station.

A fishing crane, known as Red Crane, is situated on the cliff edge at Portland Bill. The area holds many beach huts. There are a few commercial businesses in the area, including a restaurant - The Lobster Pot - and a pub - The Pulpit Inn.

Portland Bill has a number of listed buildings. The current lighthouse, along with its boundary walls, is Grade II Listed. The Old Lower Lighthouse, including its boundary walls and coastguard house, is also Grade II Listed, as is the Old Higher Lighthouse, its four cottages and boundary walls. A 19th-century Fisherman's hut is Grade II Listed, while Red Crane, part of a disused stone loading quay, which is protected as a scheduled monument.

The surrounding fields between the Bill and Southwell are made up of an ancient strip field system, once found all over the island, dating from Anglo-Saxon times. The nearby Culverwell Mesolithic Site is a Mesolithic settlement, located along the Portland Bill Road. The site is said to be circa 7500–8500 years old and has also become a scheduled monument. This includes surrounding fields, also relating to the Mesolithic period, and these fields lead across to the coastline.

== Gallery ==
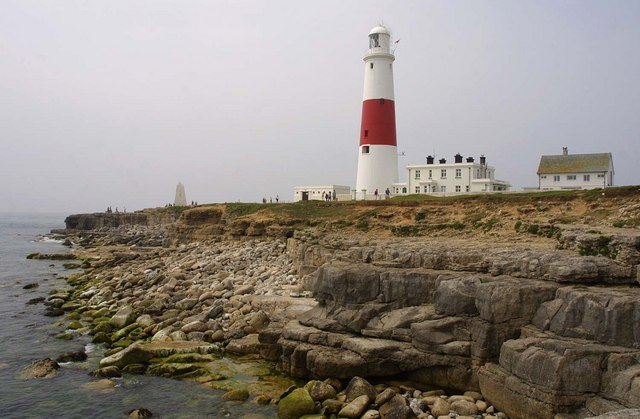
Portland Bill

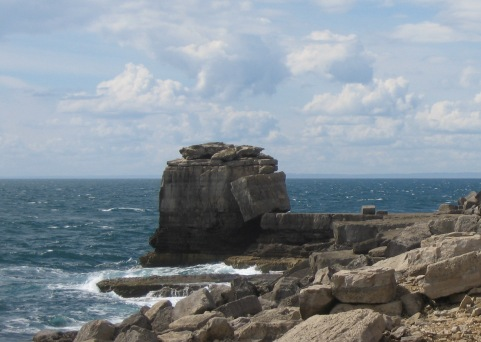
Pulpit Rock at Portland Bill

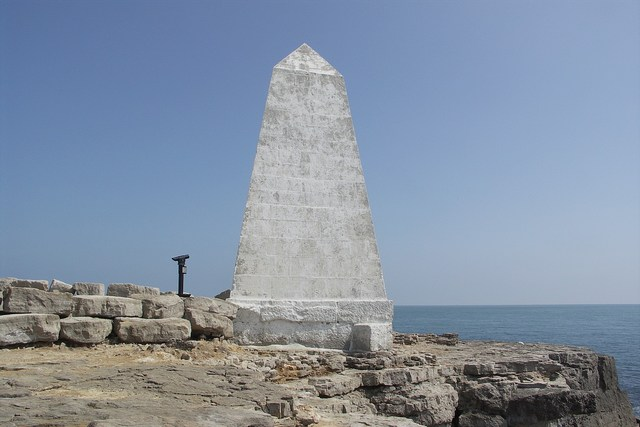
The Trinity House Obelisk

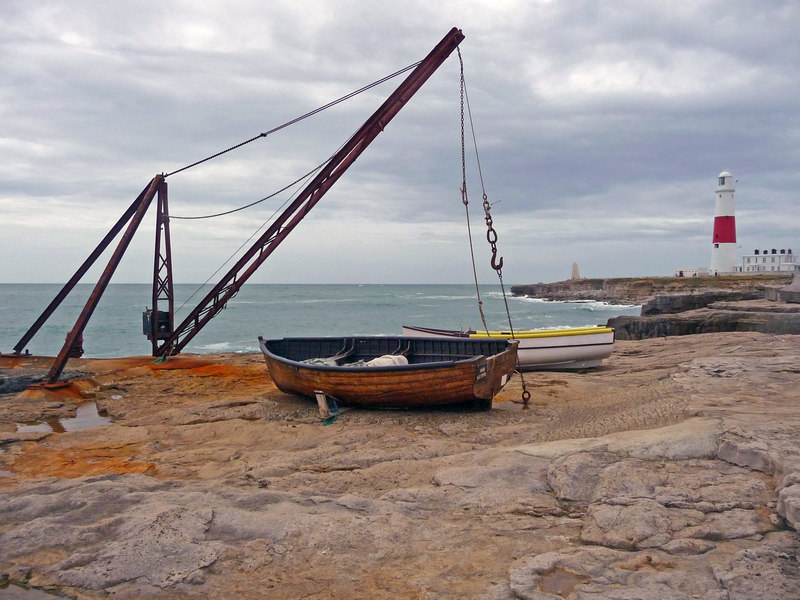
Portland Bill's Steel Crane

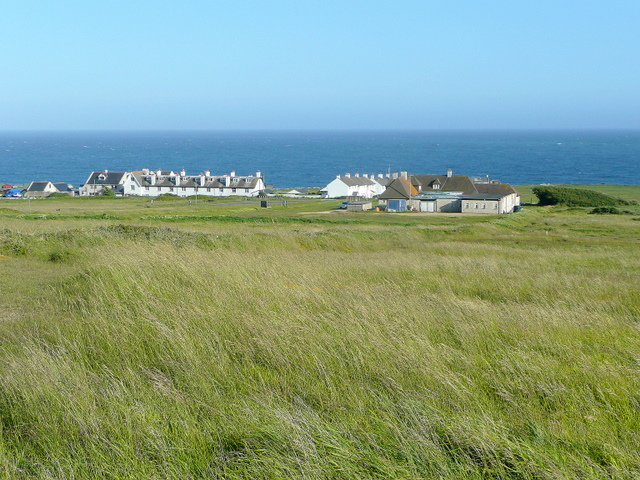
The settlement of Portland Bill

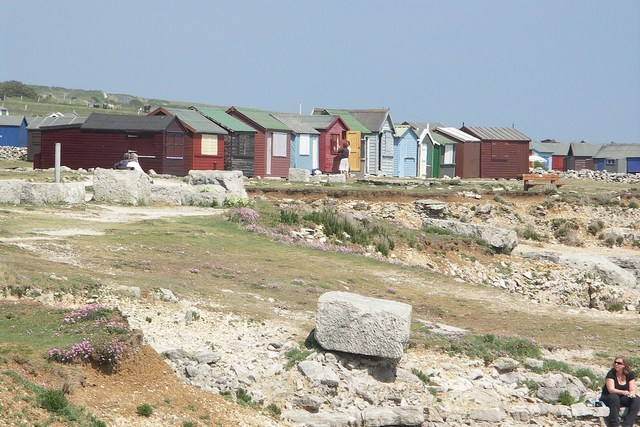
Beach Huts at Portland Bill

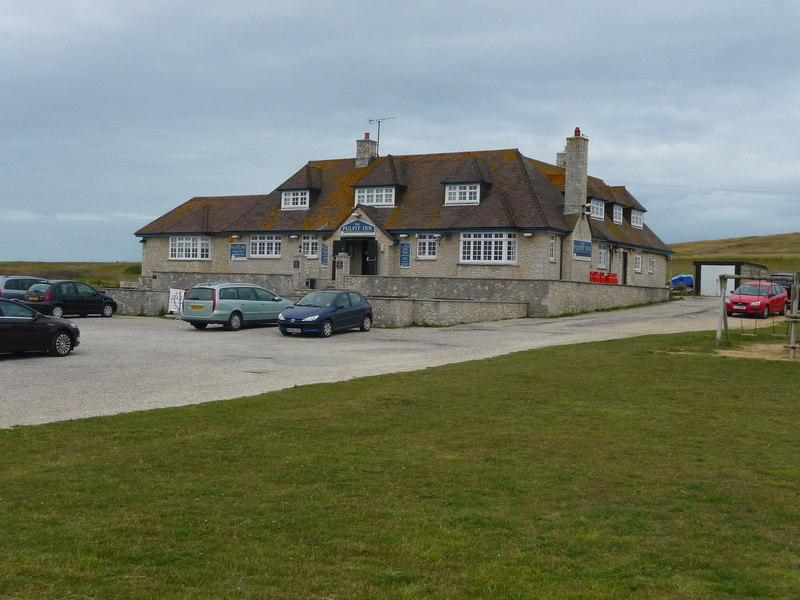
Pulpit Inn

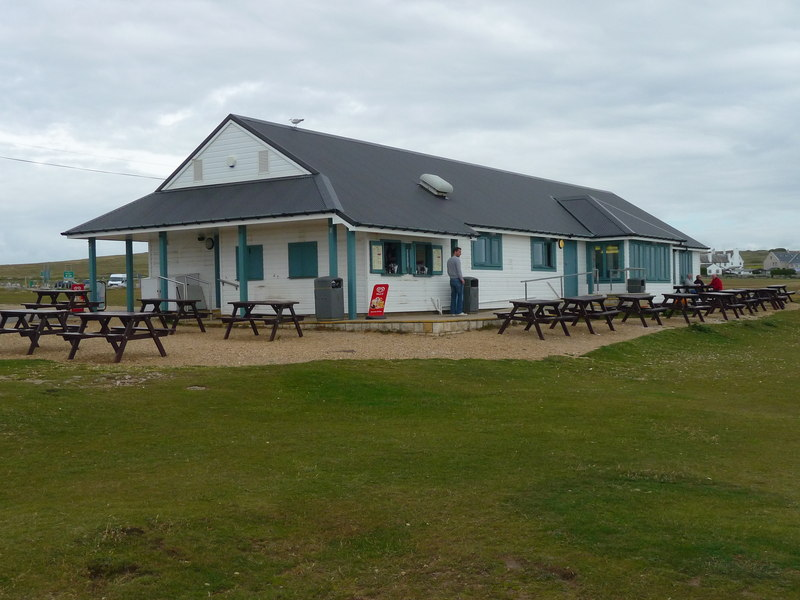
Lobster Pot Restaurant

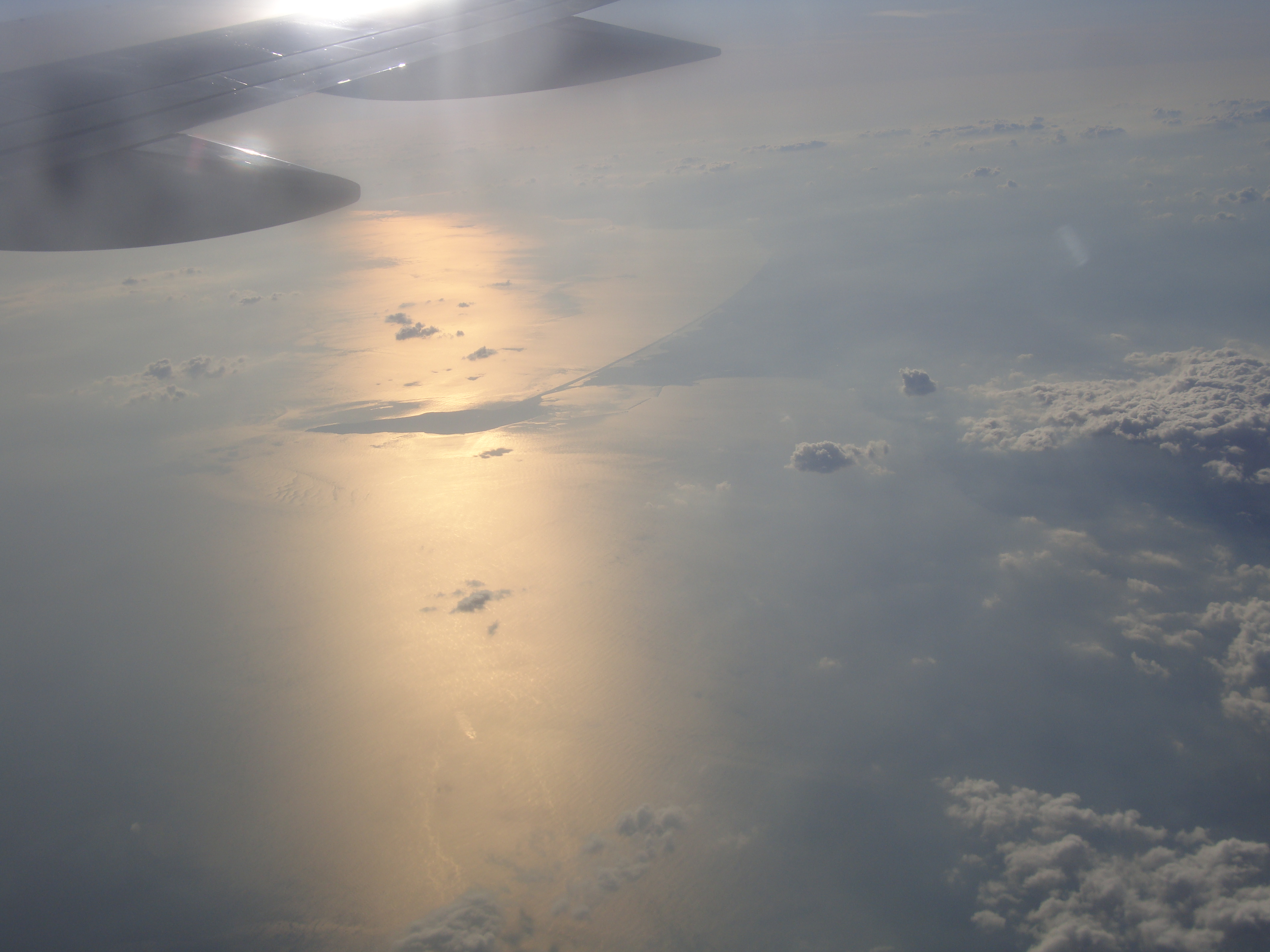
Portland Bill and Chesil Beach from the air

== See also ==
- Chesil Beach
- Jurassic Coast
