= MOD Portland Bill =

- Isle of Portland, Dorset in England

Site information
- Owner: Ministry of Defence
- Operator: Qinetiq

Location
- Shown within Dorset MOD Portland Bill (the United Kingdom)
- Coordinates: 50°30′58″N 02°27′29″W

Site history
- Built: 1960s
- In use: 1960s - present

MOD Portland Bill is a Ministry of Defence site, managed by QinetiQ, used for magnetic measurement on the Isle of Portland, Dorset, England. The facility is situated at Portland Bill, where tests can be performed well away from stray electric and magnetic fields.

== History ==
The site was chosen during the 1960s for magnetic measurement due to Portland Bill's remoteness and magnetic cleanliness. As Portland stone, which was used on Buckingham Palace, is non-magnetic, as well as the site's remoteness, the site is free from any magnetic disturbance such as heavy traffic, and as a result, very small magnetic fields from equipment can be measured with a very high degree of accuracy.

== Role ==
The site is used to magnetically assess any item, but mainly MCMV and EOD equipment. Magnetic compasses can also be tested. The unique facility is both notified and approved by the Maritime and Coastguard Agency and is the only accredited centre for Type Approval of Magnetic Compasses and Binnacles in the United Kingdom.

=== Land Magnetic Range ===
The Land Magnetic Range is a secure and magnetically stable environment, primarily used to measure the magnetic fields found in Mine Counter Measure Vessel equipment. The range uses inbuilt coil systems which enable the Earth's magnetic field to be reduced to zero, simulate anywhere on the planet, or provide only the vertical or horizontal portion of the Earth field to pass through the item under test, which an equivalent Sea Range cannot do. It is possible to carry out susceptibility testing to identify possible effects on equipment in strong magnetic fields.

=== Electronic Warfare Calibration Centre ===
The Electronic Warfare Calibration Centre (EW Calfac) calibrates ships and submarines electronic warfare systems. Royal Navy ships are generally calibrated once a year, or just before a deployment, by carrying out 360-degree pivots 5 to 10 miles off Portland Bill while identifying signals that can mimic various threats or targets.

=== EOD Range ===
The EOD area tests the equipment of EOD divers.

=== Compass Test Centre ===
The Compass Test Centre inspects and tests magnetic compasses, whilst also delivering them to RAF stations across the UK. The Compass Base Calibration Surveys is a designated area of survey and certification, used for accurate swinging of Aircraft Navigation Equipment for both military and civilian airfields.

== See also ==
- Admiralty Underwater Weapons Establishment
- Defence Research Agency (United Kingdom)
- Portland spy ring
