= Portland Bill Lighthouse =

Lighthouse on the Isle of Portland, Dorset, England

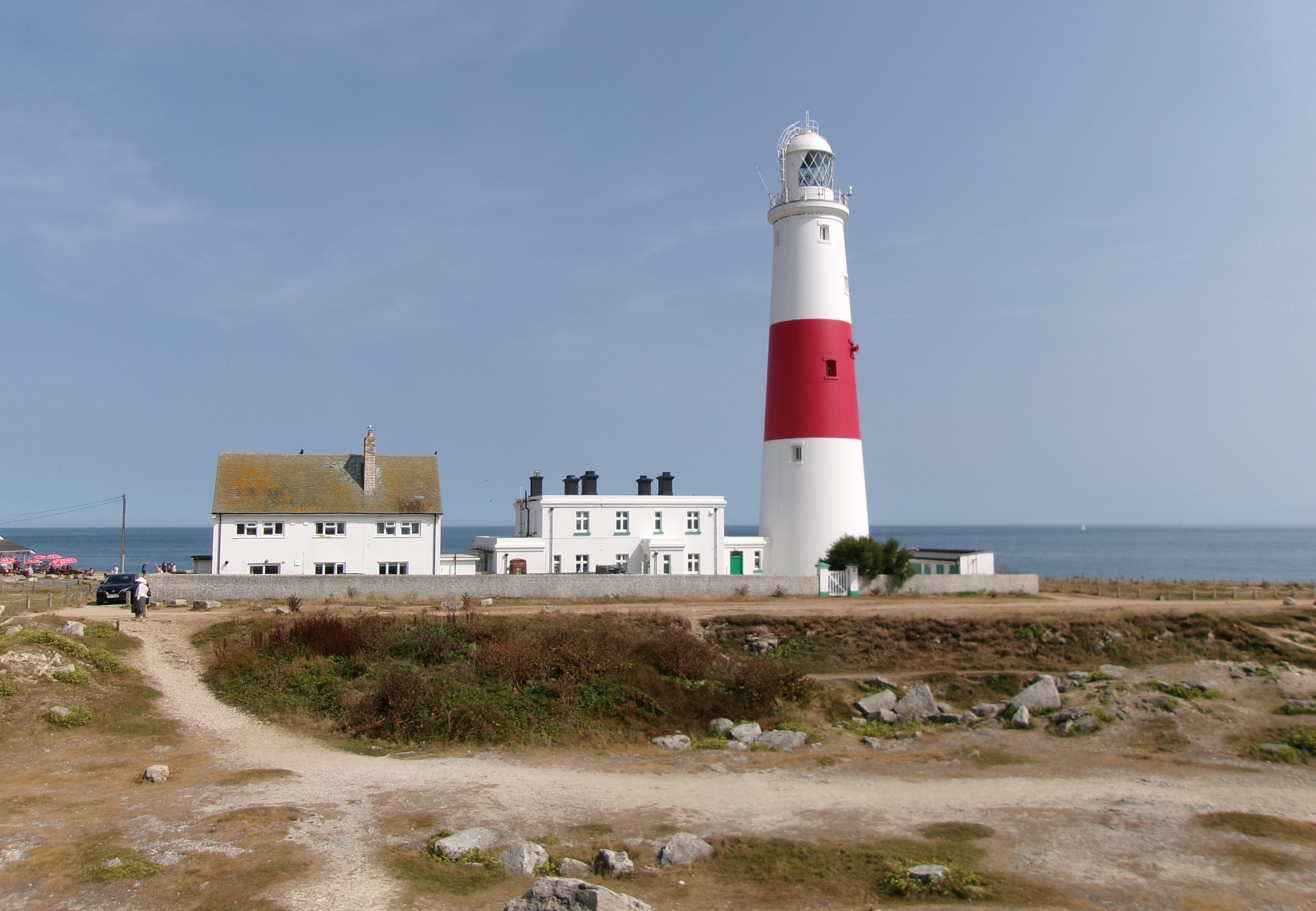
- Portland Bill Lighthouse
- Location: Portland Bill; Isle of Portland; Dorset; England
- OS grid: SY6773768376
- Coordinates: 50.514155°N 2.456383°W

Tower
- Constructed: 1903-05
- Construction: sandstone tower
- Automated: 1996
- Height: 41 metres (135 ft)
- Shape: tapered cylindrical tower with balcony and lantern
- Markings: white tower with a red horizontal band, white lantern
- Operator: The Crown Estate
- Heritage: Grade II listed building

Light
- First lit: 1906
- Focal height: 43 metres (141 ft)
- Lens: 1st order catadioptric rotating (original), LED lantern (current)
- Intensity: 635,000 candela
- Range: 18 nautical miles (33 km; 21 mi)
- Characteristic: Fl (4) W 20s.

Portland Bill Lighthouse is a functioning lighthouse at Portland Bill, on the Isle of Portland, Dorset, England. The lighthouse and its boundary walls are Grade II Listed.

As Portland Bill's largest and most recent lighthouse, the Trinity House operated Portland Bill Lighthouse is distinctively white and red striped, standing at a height of 41 metres (135 ft). It was completed by 1906 and first shone out on 11 January 1906. The lighthouse guides passing vessels through the hazardous waters surrounding the Bill, while also acting as a waymark for ships navigating the English Channel.

== History ==
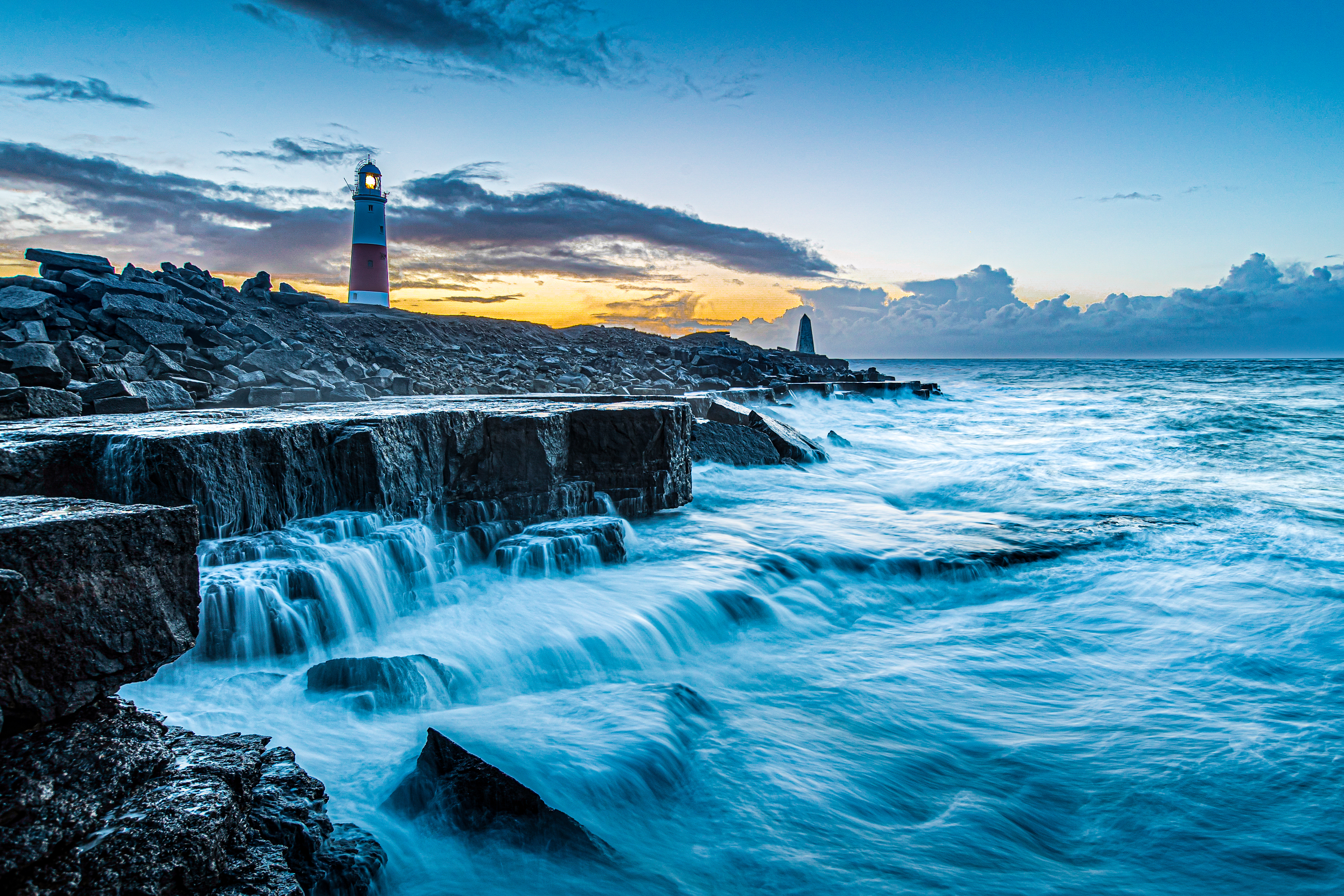
Portland Bill Lighthouse at dawn with Trinity House Landmark in the distance

The two original lighthouses, now known as the Old Higher Lighthouse and Old Lower Lighthouse, operated as a pair of leading lights to guide ships between Portland Race and The Shambles sandbank. They were constructed in 1716, both rebuilt in 1869, and decommissioned following the completion of the present lighthouse. At the turn of the 20th-century, Trinity House put forward plans for building a new lighthouse at Bill Point. They acquired the required land in 1903.

The builders, Wakeham Bros. of Plymouth, began work on the foundations in October 1903. Chance & Co of Birmingham supplied and fitted the lantern. A pressurised vapour paraffin lamp was used, placed at the centre of a large (first-order) revolving optic; weighing 3.5 tons, this was made up of four asymmetrical catadioptric lens panels and a concave prismatic reflector. The lighthouse was completed in 1905 at a cost of £13,000, and the lamp first lit on 11 January 1906. A red sector light was provided in addition to the main light, shining from a window in the lower part of the tower, to indicate the position of The Shambles. The light was electrified in the mid-1950s.

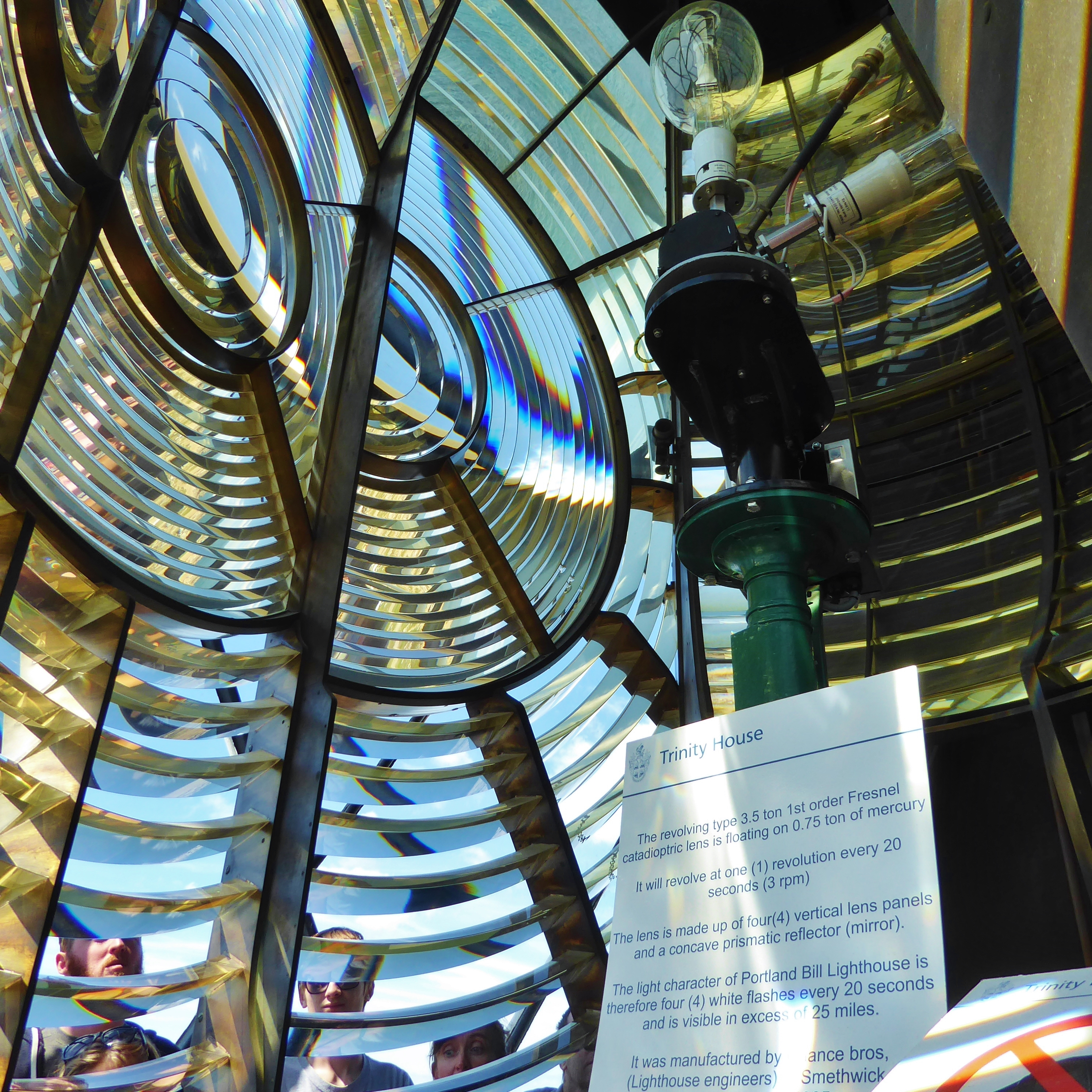
Interior view of the lamp and lenses in 2017.

In 1940 the lighthouse was provided with an F-type diaphone fog signal, sounding from a window part-way up the tower. Compressed air was provided to six cylindrical storage tanks by a pair of Reavell compressors, all located (together with a standby generator) within the base of the tower. These were connected at a higher level to the sounding tanks, which fed the compressed air to the diaphone itself, mounted behind its trumpet-like emitter which protruded through the window. Admission of air into the diaphone was controlled by a clockwork (later electric) coder, which caused the diaphone to sound a 3.5-second blast every 30 seconds. The 180 Hz note had an audible range of 7 nmi (13 km; 8.1 mi) (which could be doubled under favourable conditions). The diaphone remained in regular use as an aid to navigation until 1995, when it was replaced by a high-frequency electric fog signal (sounding from another window, further down) in readiness for automation.

On 18 March 1996, Portland Bill Lighthouse was demanned, and all monitoring and control transferred to the Trinity House Operations & Planning Centre in Harwich. The original Type F diaphone was decommissioned in 1996, but in 2003 Trinity House restored it to occasional use for the benefit of visitors; (it was sounded regularly for half an hour on Sunday mornings, except when foggy, until 2017).

In the early 21st century the lighthouse used a 1 kW MBI lamp together with the same rotating lens system that had been in use since 1906. (It flashed four times every 20 seconds with an intensity of 635,000 candelas and a range of 25 nautical miles.) The fog signal was used in times of bad weather; it gave a four-second blast every 30 seconds with a range of 2 nautical miles.

In November 2018 Trinity House applied for (and obtained) planning permission to remove the lamp and optic from the lantern room as part of a programme of modernisation. It proposed relocating the lens array to the base of the tower, which led to the removal of the historic diaphone fog-signalling equipment, installed there in 1940 and still in working order, on the basis that this was 'the only available [space] for retaining the historic optic on-site'.

== Present day ==
In 2019-2020 a new non-rotating LED light source was installed in the lantern room and a new omnidirectional fog signal was installed on the exterior lantern gallery (replacing the electric emitter installed in the 1990s). The two LED lanterns (one of which is used, the other kept on standby) have a reduced range of 18 nautical miles (33 km; 21 mi).

=== Tourist attraction ===
As Portland's prime attraction, the Portland Bill Lighthouse is open to the public for tours. A visitor centre is housed in the former lighthouse keeper's quarters. The original centre closed in 2013 due to lack of funding, however a new renovated centre opened in 2015. The tours operated at the lighthouse last approximately 45 minutes and visitors are able to climb the 153 steps to the top of the lighthouse.

== Gallery ==
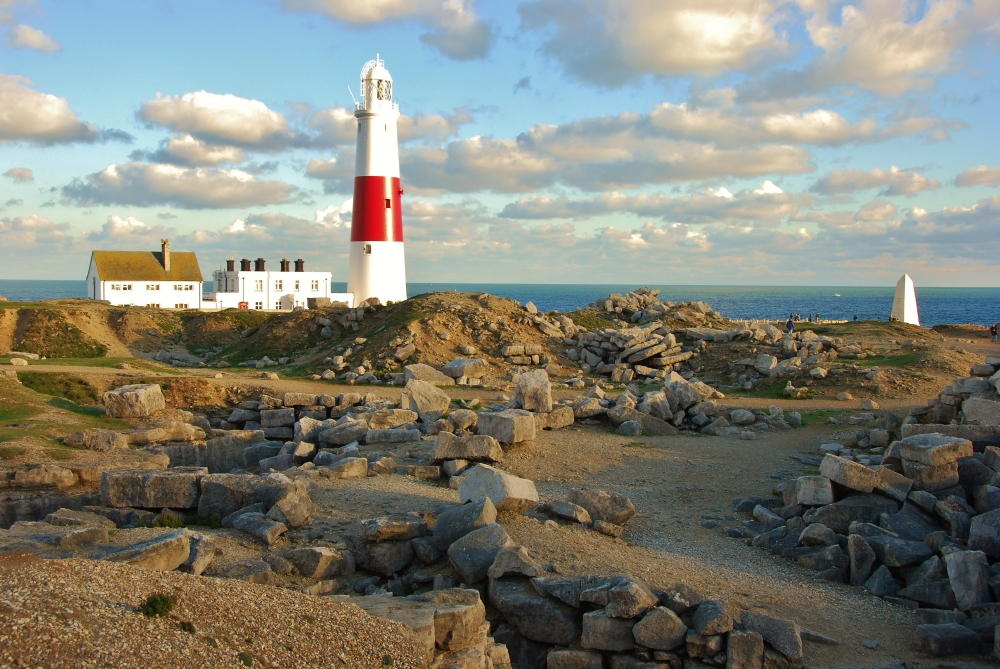
The lighthouse and the surrounding ex-quarried area.

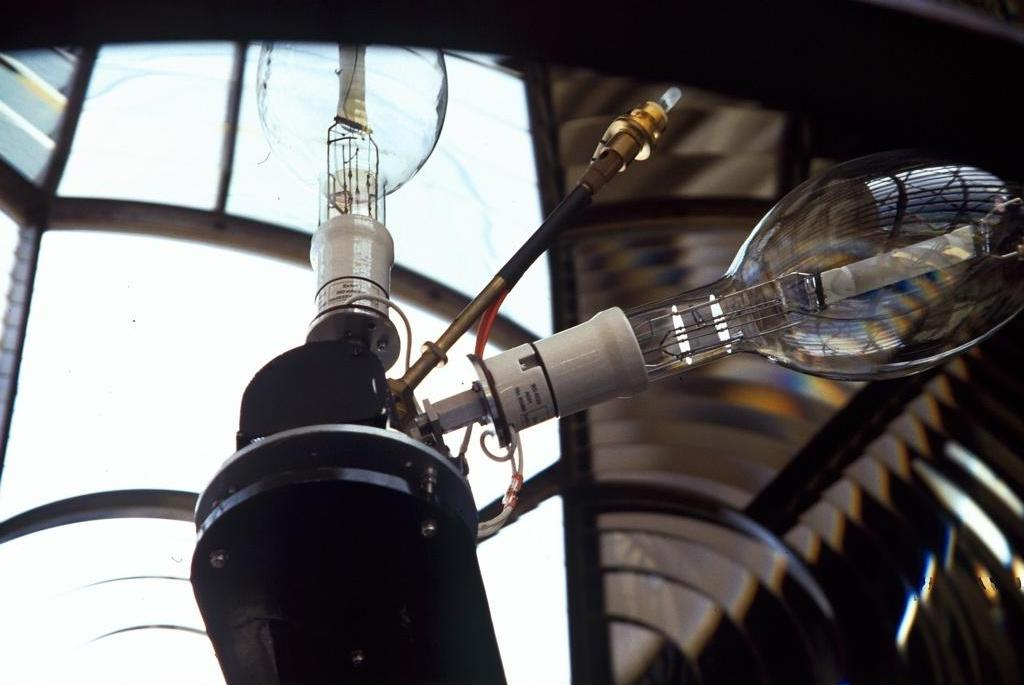
Lamps in Portland Bill Lighthouse

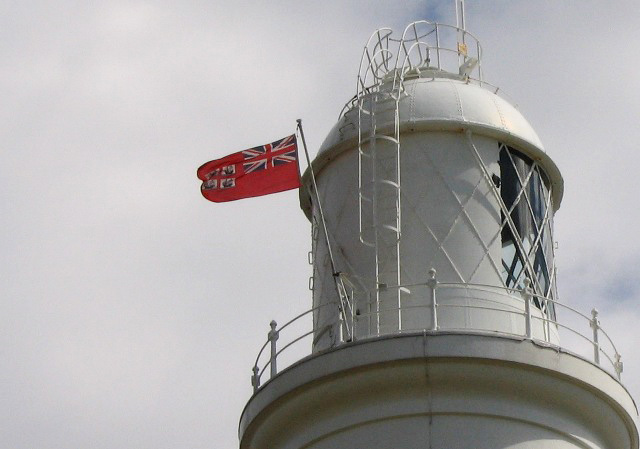
Trinity House flag on Portland Bill Lighthouse, Dorset

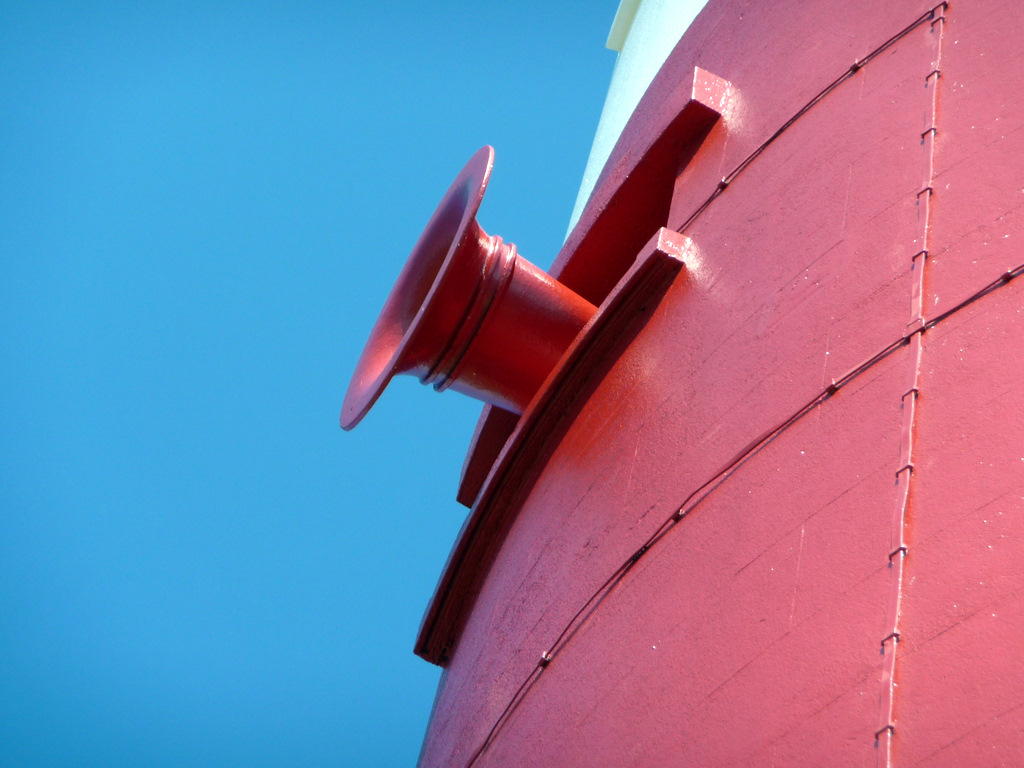
The diaphone foghorn emitter of Portland Bill Lighthouse

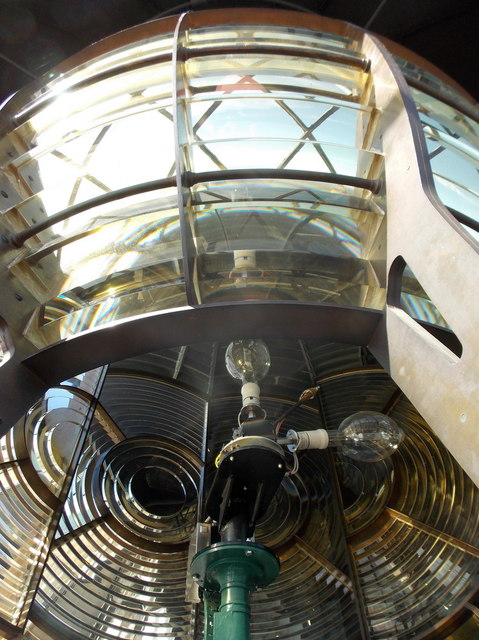
Fresnel lenses and prismatic mirror

== See also ==
- List of lighthouses in England
