= Thomas Matthews (engineer) =

British civil engineer (1849–1930)

Sir Thomas Matthews
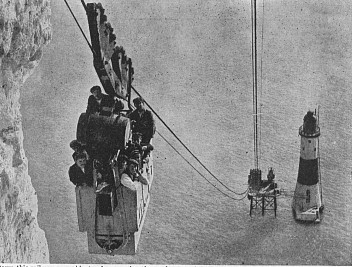
- Matthews was responsible for the engineering of Beachy Head Lighthouse. An aerial ropeway, pictured, was necessary to access the site
- Born: Thomas Matthews; 8 August 1849; Penzance, Cornwall
- Died: 13 January 1930 (aged 80); Torquay
- Occupation: Civil engineering
- Employer: Trinity House,
- Known for: Building lighthouses including Beachy Head Lighthouse; Pendeen Watch; Peninnis Lighthouse; Portland Bill Lighthouse
- Title: Engineer-in-Chief
- Term: 1892 – 1915
- Predecessor: Sir James Douglass
- Spouse: Frances Matthews (nee Blackwall)
- Children: three sons and two daughters
- Parent(s): John Matthews, Engineer and Borough Surveyor at Penzance
- Relatives: Sir William Matthews brother

Sir Thomas Matthews (8 August 1849 – 13 January 1930) was a British civil engineer, who was a notable builder of lighthouses. He was the brother of Sir William Matthews, also a prominent civil engineer. During the late 19th and early 20th century Thomas Matthews was the Engineer-in-Chief of Trinity House.

== Biography ==
Thomas Matthews was born in Penzance, Cornwall, where he was the son of the Borough Surveyor, John Matthews. From 1868 to 1871 he assisted his father in providing drinking water for Penzance and the sea and harbour defences. For the following two years he practised as an architect and surveyor in Penzance. In 1874, he entered the employment of the United Kingdom's lighthouse service, Trinity House, as an assistant engineer. He succeeded Sir James Nicholas Douglass as Engineer-in-Chief when the latter retired in 1892.

Matthews went on to design over a dozen lighthouses for Trinity House. He also worked on illumination systems, notably a lamp designed to burn oil vapour. Matthews' most significant achievement was the construction of Beachy Head Lighthouse. Completed in 1902, it was the last rock lighthouse built by Trinity House. The work took two years to finish; it involved building a coffer-dam and an aerial ropeway from the cliffs to transport materials.

== Lighthouses designed by Matthews ==
These included:

- Bamburgh Lighthouse
- Beachy Head Lighthouse
- Berry Head Lighthouse
- Black Nore Lighthouse
- Cape Pembroke Lighthouse
- Dungeness Lighthouses (High and Low)
- East Usk Lighthouse
- Egypt Point Lighthouse
- Lundy Lighthouses (North and South)
- Lynmouth Foreland Lighthouse
- St Mary's Lighthouse
- Spurn Head Lighthouse
- Strumble Head Lighthouse
- Pendeen Lighthouse
- Peninnis Lighthouse
- Portland Bill Lighthouse
- Withernsea Lighthouse
