= Foreland Point =

Headland on the north coast of Devon, England

Coordinates: 51°14′N 3°47′W

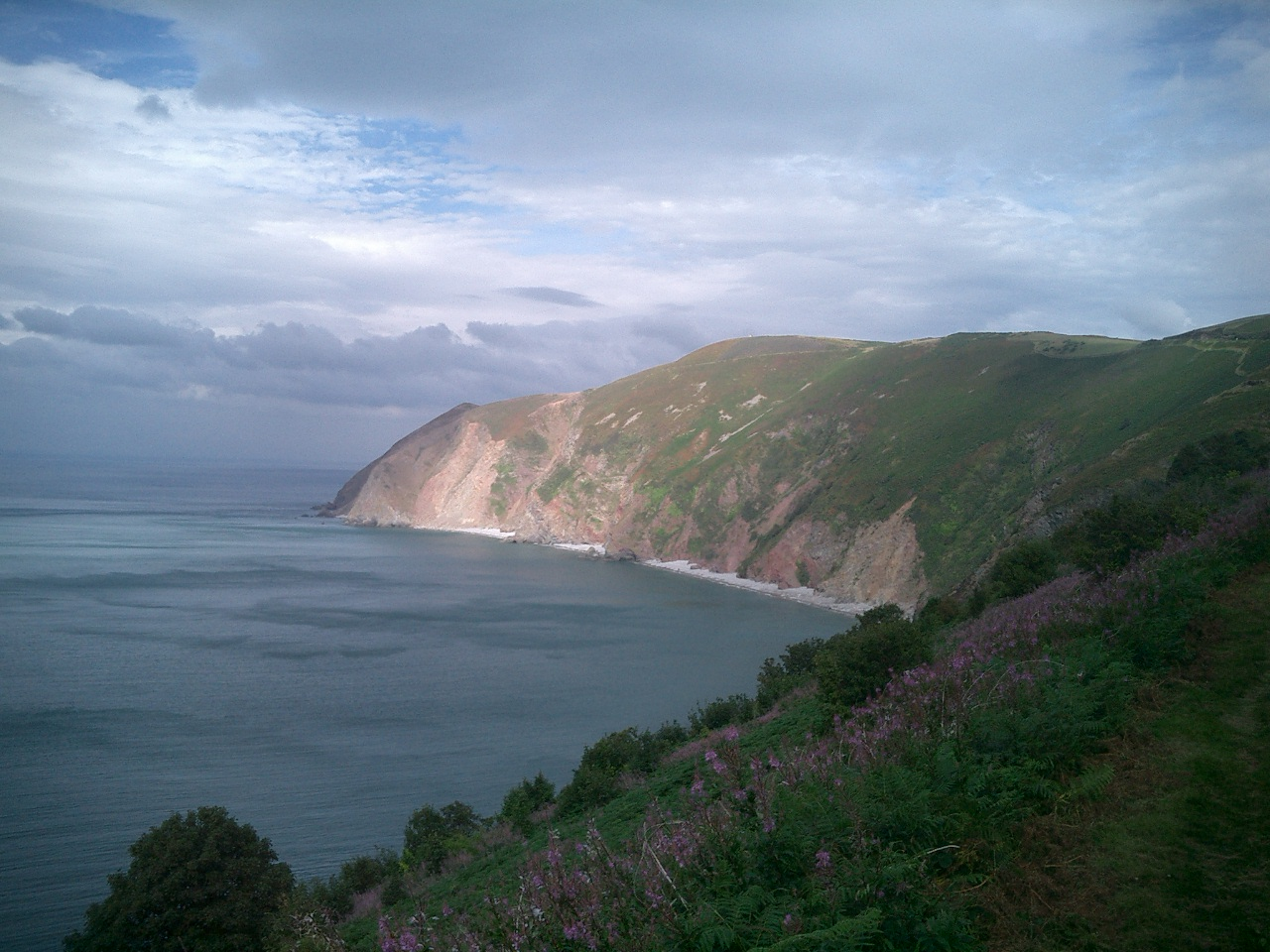
Foreland Point

Foreland Point is a rocky headland in Devon near Lynmouth, and is the most northerly point along the Devon and Exmoor coast. The highest cliff is 89 metres (292 ft) above the high tide, although the highest point of the entire headland is near Countisbury (a village around a mile away) at 302 metres (991 ft). The headland is owned by the National Trust; some areas are open to public access all year, as part of the South West Coast Path, while other areas have limited access. The Trinity House-operated Lynmouth Foreland Lighthouse is also located here.

The area of the sea between Bideford and Foreland Point is a Marine Conservation Zone.
