= William Matthews (engineer) =

British civil engineer

- Matthews in 1911
- Born: 8 March 1844; Penzance, Cornwall, England
- Died: 8 January 1922 (aged 77)
- Education: Glenalmond College and King's College London
- Engineering career
- Discipline: Civil,
- Institutions: Institution of Civil Engineers (president),
- Projects: Port of Dover, Grand Harbour
- Awards: Order of St Michael and St George (knight commander), Belgian Order of Leopold (officer)

Sir William Matthews KCMG (8 March 1844 – 8 January 1922) was a British civil engineer.

He was educated at Glenalmond College and King's College London.

Matthews was born in Penzance to John and Alice Matthews. John Matthews was, at that time, the borough surveyor for Penzance. William spent a few years working for his father as an assistant surveyor before gaining work as chief assistant to John Coode. He was eventually made a partner in Coode's firm which became Coode, Son and Matthews.

His most notable works with the firm were harbours and docks, many of which were undertaken for the Admiralty, and included works on Dover Harbour, Singapore Docks and the Grand Harbour in Valletta, Malta. He also undertook inspections of Cape Colony, Ceylon, Cyprus, Hong Kong and Malta harbours for the British Admiralty. On 9 July 1906, he was appointed to a Royal Commission to investigate tidal and coastal flooding in the United Kingdom, and in 1912 he was appointed to the Royal Commission on Fuel and Engines.

He became an associate member of the Institution of Civil Engineers in 1870, a full member in 1876 and served as president between November 1907 and November 1908. He was appointed a Companion of the Order of St Michael and St George (CMG) in 1901, and a Knight Commander (KCMG) of the same order in 1906. He was also made an officer of the Belgian Order of Léopold in 1894 in recognition of his work on Zeebrugge Harbour.

His brother, Thomas Matthews, was from 1892 the Engineer-in-Chief of Trinity House, the British lighthouse authority.

Professional and academic associations
Preceded by Alexander Kennedy	President of the Institution of Civil Engineers; November 1907 – November 1908	Succeeded by James Charles Inglis
