= Lynmouth Foreland Lighthouse =

Lighthouse in Devon, England

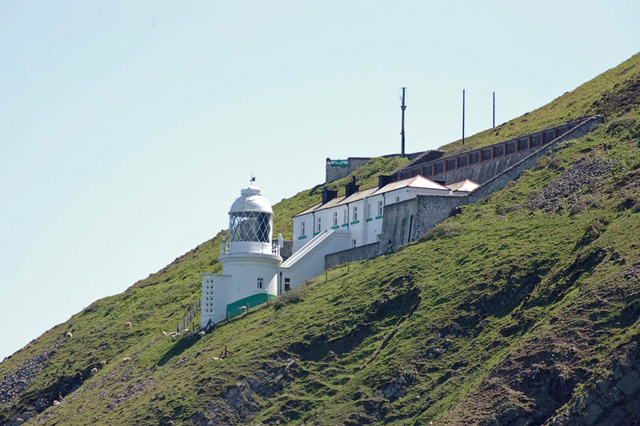
- Lynmouth Foreland Lighthouse in 2007
- Location: Lynmouth; Devon; England
- OS grid: SS7538951096
- Coordinates: 51°14′44″N 3°47′12″W

Tower
- Constructed: 1900
- Construction: brick tower
- Automated: 1994
- Height: 15 m (49 ft)
- Shape: cylindrical tower with balcony and lantern attached to 1-storey keeper's house
- Markings: white tower and lantern
- Operator: National Trust
- Heritage: Grade II listed building

Light
- Focal height: 67 m (220 ft)
- Lens: 1st order 920mm focal length, dioptric, (8 panels in 2 groups of 4 asymmetrical) rotating (1900-2021)
- Light source: LED lamp
- Intensity: 150,000 candela
- Range: 18 nmi (33 km; 21 mi)
- Characteristic: Fl (4) W 15s.

Lynmouth Foreland Lighthouse (also called the Countisbury Foreland Lighthouse, after the nearby village) is located on Foreland Point; it was originally simply named 'The Foreland Lighthouse'. First lit on 28 September 1900, the lighthouse was built to assist vessels passing through the Bristol Channel, and is a round brick tower painted white. The light is 67 metres (220 ft) above the high tide, and flashes 4 times every 15 seconds.

The original optic ('a 1st Order dioptric apparatus, eight panels in two groups of four, revolving on a mercury float pedestal') was manufactured by Chance Brothers & Co.; it was very similar to that installed in Pendeen Lighthouse the same year. It was rotated by clockwork until 1975, after which it was motor driven. Initially, the light was said to have the power of 56,750 candles; later (its oil lamp having been superseded by a more powerful paraffin vapour burner) the intensity of the light was rated at around 190,000 candlepower.

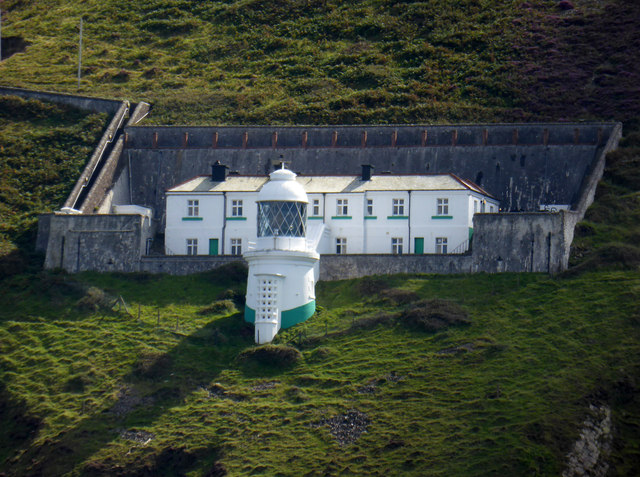
North aspect of the lighthouse as seen from a passing vessel.

In 1906, the lighthouse was provided with an explosive fog signal, which sounded once every five minutes and was actuated by an automatic clockwork firing mechanism. This was housed in a hut at the top of the steep steps leading down to the lighthouse, (the hut has since been demolished, along with the adjacent explosives magazine). The explosive signal remained in use until 1958 (a few years later the mechanism was offered 'on permanent loan to any British museum which may be interested'). In its place, a triple-frequency electric fog signal was installed, sounding through a stack of thirty Tannoy speakers built on to the front of the lighthouse tower; because the lighthouse was not yet connected to mains electricity the 3,000 rpm alternator (which simultaneously generated alternating current of the three different frequencies required) was driven by a diesel engine. The fog signal has since been decommissioned.

The light was electrified in 1975, when diesel generators were installed. Mains electricity was brought to the lighthouse in 1989, and it was automated in November 1994. In 2020 Trinity House submitted a planning application for the removal of the Fresnel lenses (and the more modern emergency light currently bracketed to the gallery railings), and their replacement with a pair of static LED lights (one 'primary', one 'standby') to stand on the old lens pedestal. This work, part of their programme to replace all the mercury floated rotating lens systems in their lighthouses with static LEDs, was begun with the decommissioning of the old optic and lamp in October 2021, and completed with the commissioning of the new LED lanterns in January 2022. Afterwards it was announced that the decommissioned lenses would be loaned to Lynmouth Sailing Club, who hope to put them on public display.

Lynmouth Foreland had always been an unpopular posting among lighthouse keepers, not least because (due to its position on a steep north-facing slope) the isolated compound never sees the sun except during the three months of high summer. The lighthouse keeper's cottage is now a National Trust holiday cottage. Porpoise and sea birds can be spied from its windows, and deer often shelter in the combe down to the lighthouse.

== See also ==
- List of lighthouses in England
