= Pendeen Lighthouse =

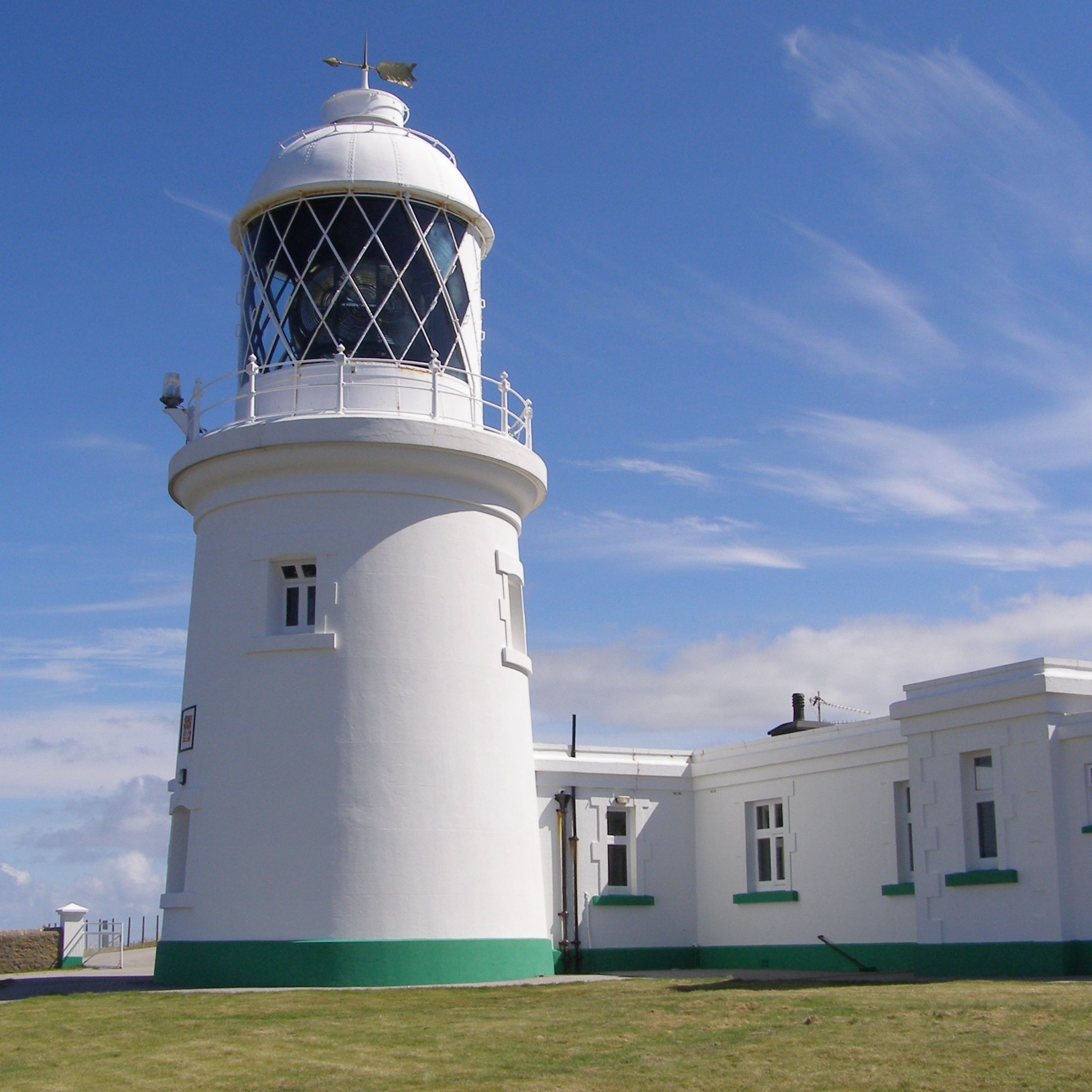
- Location: Pendeen, Cornwall, St Just in Penwith, United Kingdom
- Coordinates: 50°09′54″N 5°40′18″W

Tower
- Constructed: 1900
- Construction: concrete rubblestone tower
- Automated: 1995
- Height: 17 m (56 ft)
- Shape: cylindrical tower with balcony and lantern
- Markings: White
- Operator: Trinity House

Light
- First lit: 3 October 1900
- Focal height: 59 m (194 ft)
- Lens: 1st order dioptric, 2 groups of 4 panels, rotating lens (former); LED lantern (current)
- Intensity: 18,700 candela
- Range: 16 nmi (30 km; 18 mi)
- Characteristic: Fl(4) W 15s

Listed Building – Grade II
- Official name: Pendeen lighthouse and keepers' cottages with courtyard walls
- Designated: 12 March 1997
- Reference no.: 1268242

Listed Building – Grade II
- Official name: Engine house at Pendeen lighthouse
- Designated: 12 March 1997
- Reference no.: 1268243

Listed Building – Grade II
- Official name: Boundary and garden walls to Pendeen lighthouse
- Designated: 12 March 1997
- Reference no.: 1257670

Pendeen Lighthouse, also known as Pendeen Watch, is an active aid to navigation located 2 kilometres (1.2 mi) to the north of Pendeen in west Cornwall, England. It is located within the Aire Point to Carrick Du SSSI, the Cornwall Area of Outstanding Natural Beauty and the Penwith Heritage Coast. The South West Coast Path passes to the south.

== Layout ==
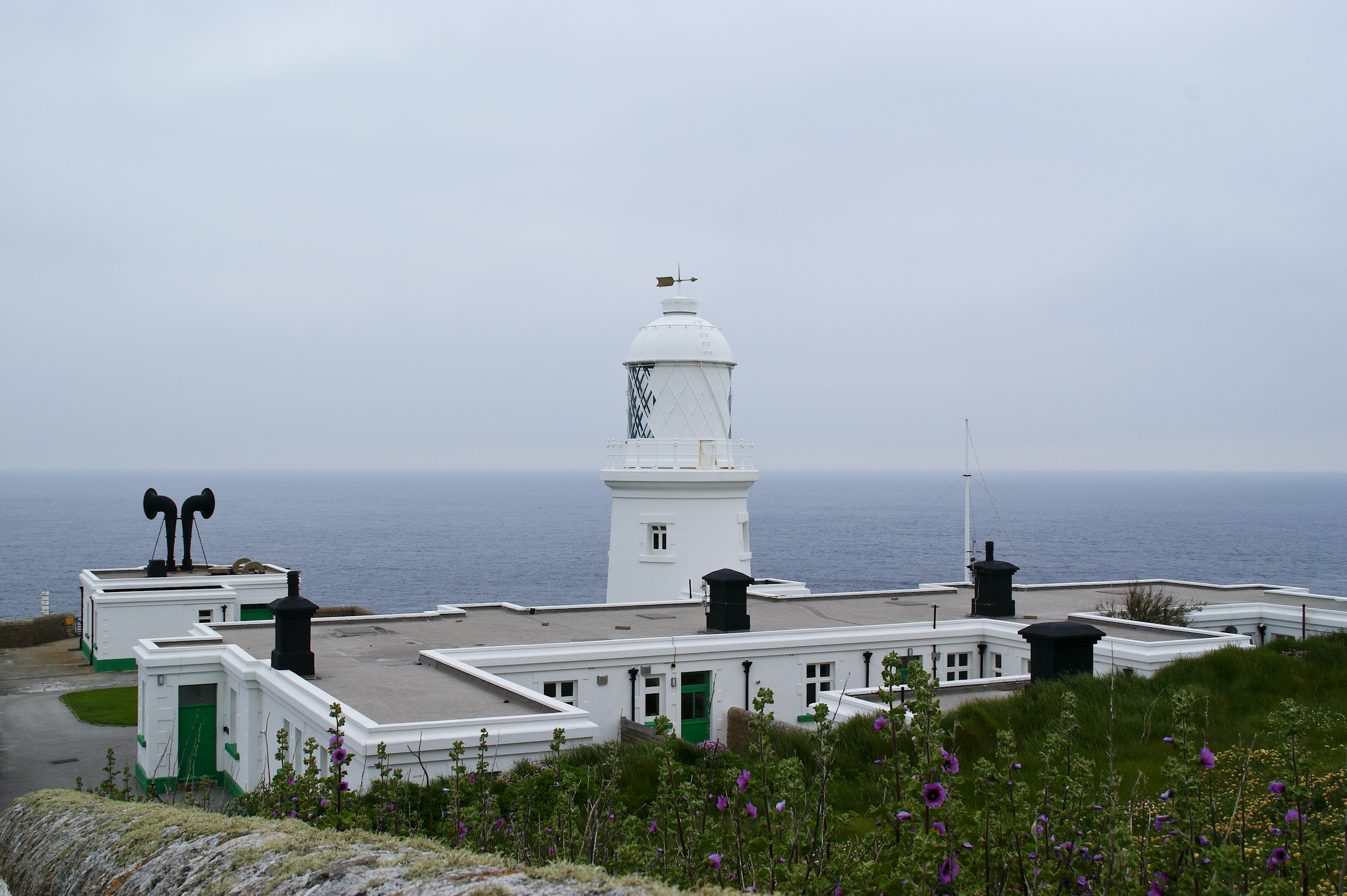
Former ancillary buildings including the fog horn engine house (left) and keepers' accommodation (foreground)

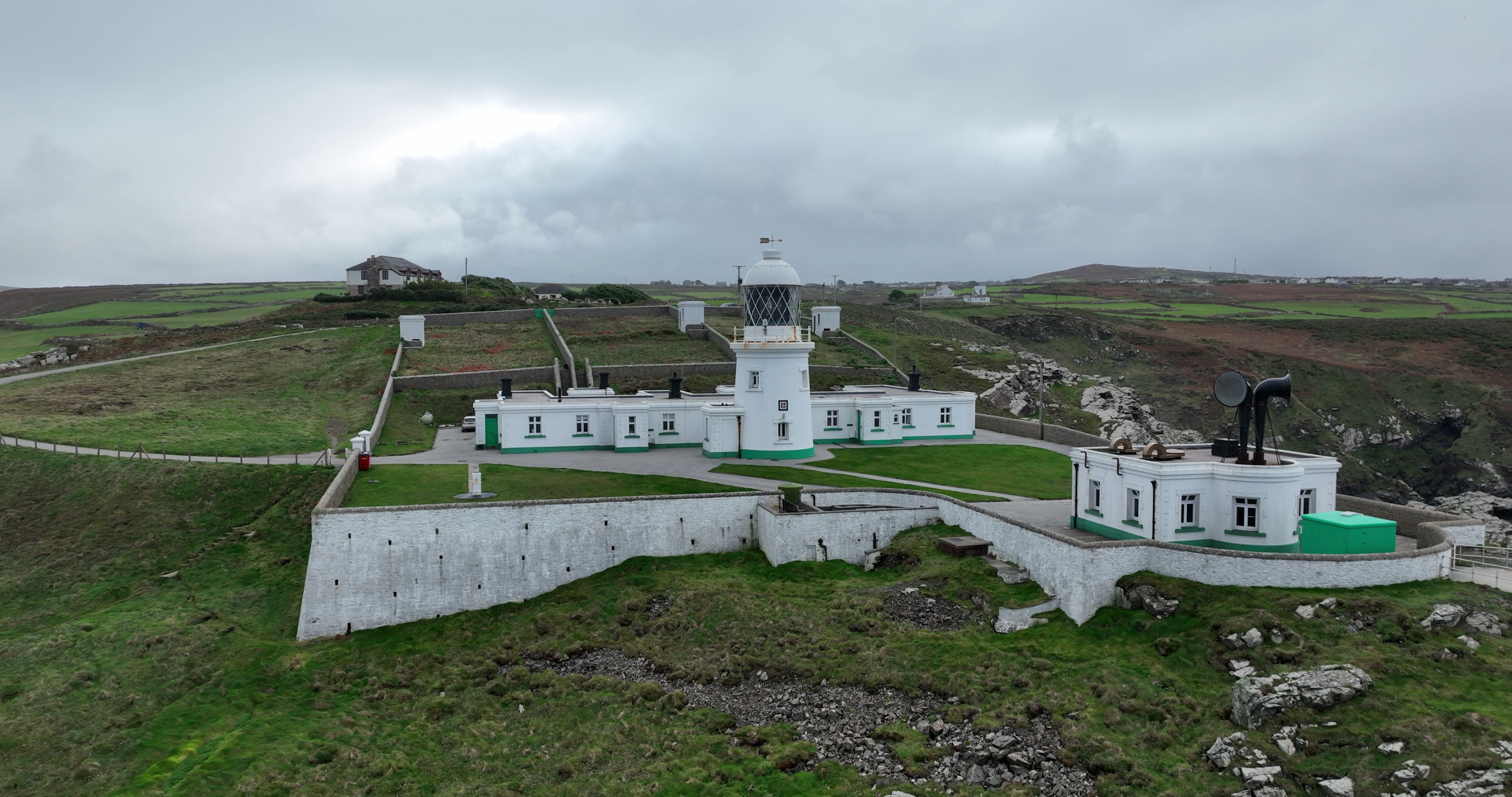
Aerial view of Pendeen Watch headland and Pendeen Lighthouse, Cornwall, England.

Attached to the tower itself, there is an E-shaped building split into a terrace of four cottages. Three of the cottages were originally used to house the three resident keepers, their wives and families, with the fourth used as an office area and sleeping accommodation for the supernumerary keepers. They are now let as holiday cottages. Water was originally collected off the flat roof of the accommodation block and stored in an underground tank. Behind the cottages are three kitchen gardens (which soon fell into disuse as nothing would grow in such an exposed position). On the seaward side of the complex, the fog siren and its accompanying machinery is housed in a separate building.

=== Significance ===
The lighthouse, together with the attached keepers' cottages, are Grade II listed, as is the separate engine house (with its fog horn equipment), along with other associated buildings and the boundary walls. Pendeen's engine house is 'the only example in the country to have retained its 12" siren with associated machinery'.

== Construction ==
Trinity House decided to build a lighthouse and foghorn here in 1891 and the building was designed by their engineer Sir Thomas Matthews. The 17 metres (56 ft) tower, buildings and surrounding wall were constructed by Arthur Carkeek of Redruth who had to flatten the headland before building could commence. The light was first lit on 3 October 1900.

=== Lamp and optic ===
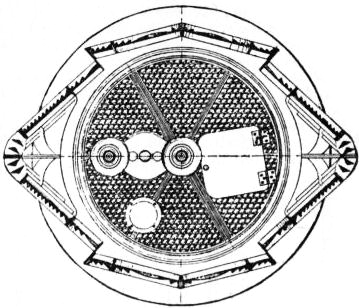
Plan view (1911) of the lens panels, arranged in two groups of four around a central lamp. (Also shown, left of centre, is the standby lamp.)

A five–wick Argand lamp was initially provided, by Messrs Chance of Smethwick, near Birmingham; but this was replaced in 1906 by a Matthews 3-50mm dia. mantle lamp. (The original Argand oil lamp was initially retained as a standby lamp, and it was later put on display at the Trinity House National Lighthouse Museum in Penzance).

Chance Brothers also manufactured the lens system: a large (first-order) rotating optic made up of two sets of four panels (eight panels in all), which displayed a group of four flashes every fifteen seconds, (which remained in use until 2023); it had a range of 20 nautical miles (37 km; 23 mi).

In 1922 a 75mm Hood incandescent oil burner was installed in place of the earlier lamp; Pendeen was one of the first lighthouses to be fitted with this new type of mantle lamp, which increased the light's visible range to almost 28 nautical miles (52 km; 32 mi).

=== Fog siren ===
The fog signal was sounded from a detached engine house a little to the north-west. In 1900 it contained a pair of Hornsby oil engines providing compressed air for the twin 5-inch sirens, which sounded a seven-second blast every one-and-a-half minutes, through vertical curved trumpets (still in place) on the engine room roof.

Between 1924 and 1926, Pendeen was the first Trinity House station to be fitted with a new, more powerful 12-inch siren, which gave a seven-second blast once a minute. This was part of a general upgrade to the lighthouse, which would also see new Gardner semi-diesel engines installed in the engine house and an electric filament lamp replacing the petroleum vapour light in the lantern.

== Electrification ==
In 1926 Pendeen was one of the first Trinity House lighthouses to be equipped with an incandescent light bulb: 'in order to obviate a watch being kept during fog both in the engine room and the lantern, electric light has been introduced in place of the petroleum-vapour lamps and the apparatus in the lantern made automatic'. The electric current was generated by dynamos directly coupled to another set of semi-diesel engines. The lamp used was an Osram 3.5 kW gas-filled bulb, specially designed for Trinity House by the General Electric Company. The automated equipment included a turntable lamp changer: in the event of a lamp failure, a reserve bulb was brought into position and lit (and an alarm notified the keeper), and if the reserve bulb then failed, it was replaced by a self-lighting acetylene lamp; the system remained in use until the mid-1990s.

In the engine house, the Gardners were replaced by a pair of Ruston & Hornsby diesels in 1963. That same year the hand-wound clockwork which turned the lens was replaced by a pair of electric motors.

== Automation ==
Pendeen Lighthouse was automated in 1995 with the keepers leaving the station on 3 May. The original revolving optic was retained, but equipped with new 35W metal-halide lamps (on a new automatic lamp changer) in place of the 3.5 kW filament bulbs. These, and the motors to turn the optic, were battery-powered (with the batteries being charged from the mains or from a standby generator when needed). As part of the preparation for automation the fog siren was decommissioned and replaced with a roof-mounted electric fog signal, sounding once every 20 seconds; (The fog signal was decommissioned in April 2014).

== Upgrade ==
In 2023 the revolving fresnel lens assembly was removed as part of a Trinity House project to eliminate the use of mercury from its lighthouses (the lens floated in a cast iron bath containing around 40 litres (8.8 imp gal; 11 US gal) of the liquid metal, vapour from which is now deemed hazardous to health). In 2024 a new self-contained LED lantern unit was installed in place of the old lens.

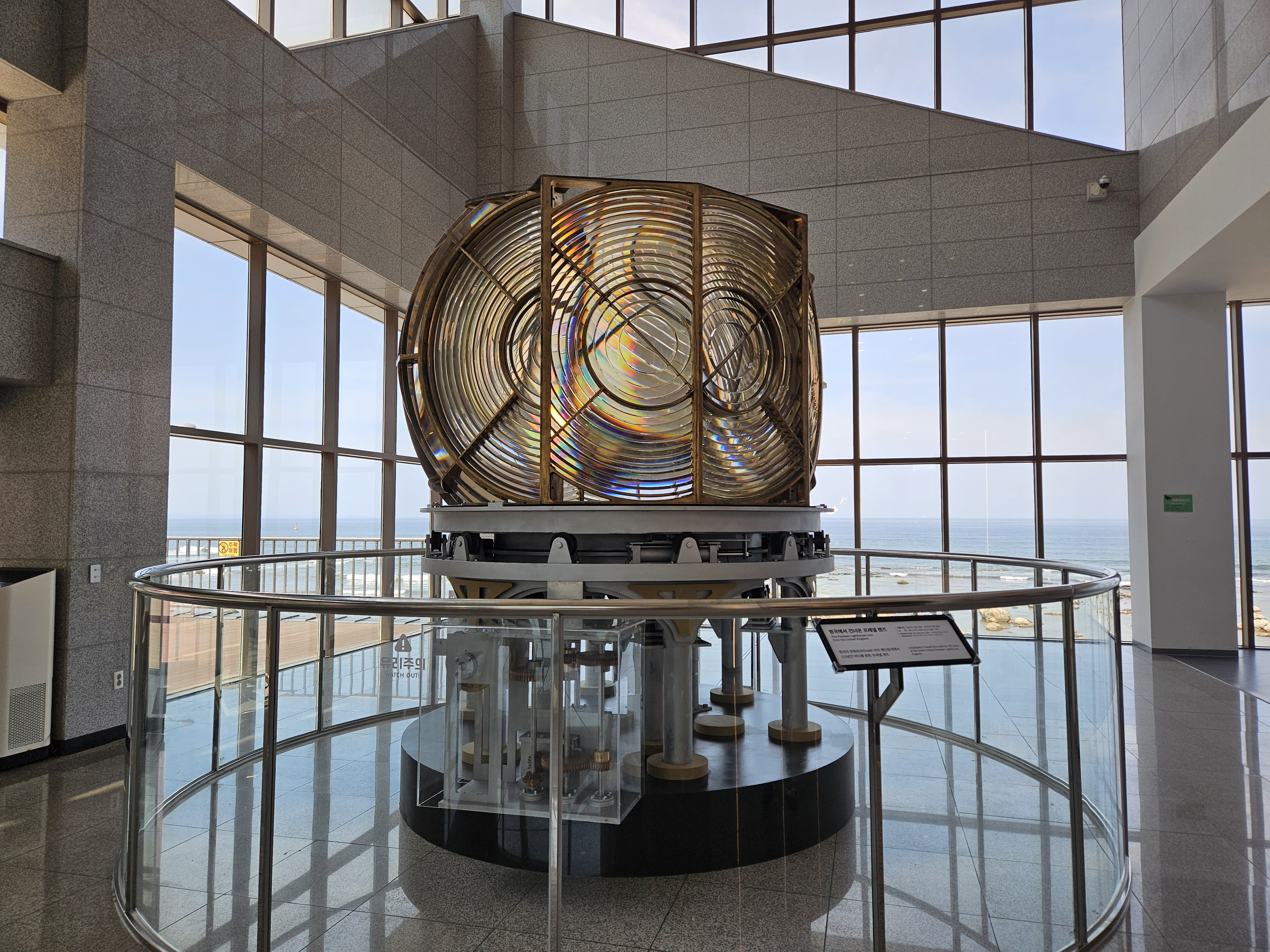
Display in South Korea

In 2026 the old optic was sent to South Korea on a ten-year loan, to be reassembled and exhibited in the National Lighthouse Museum.

== Gallery ==
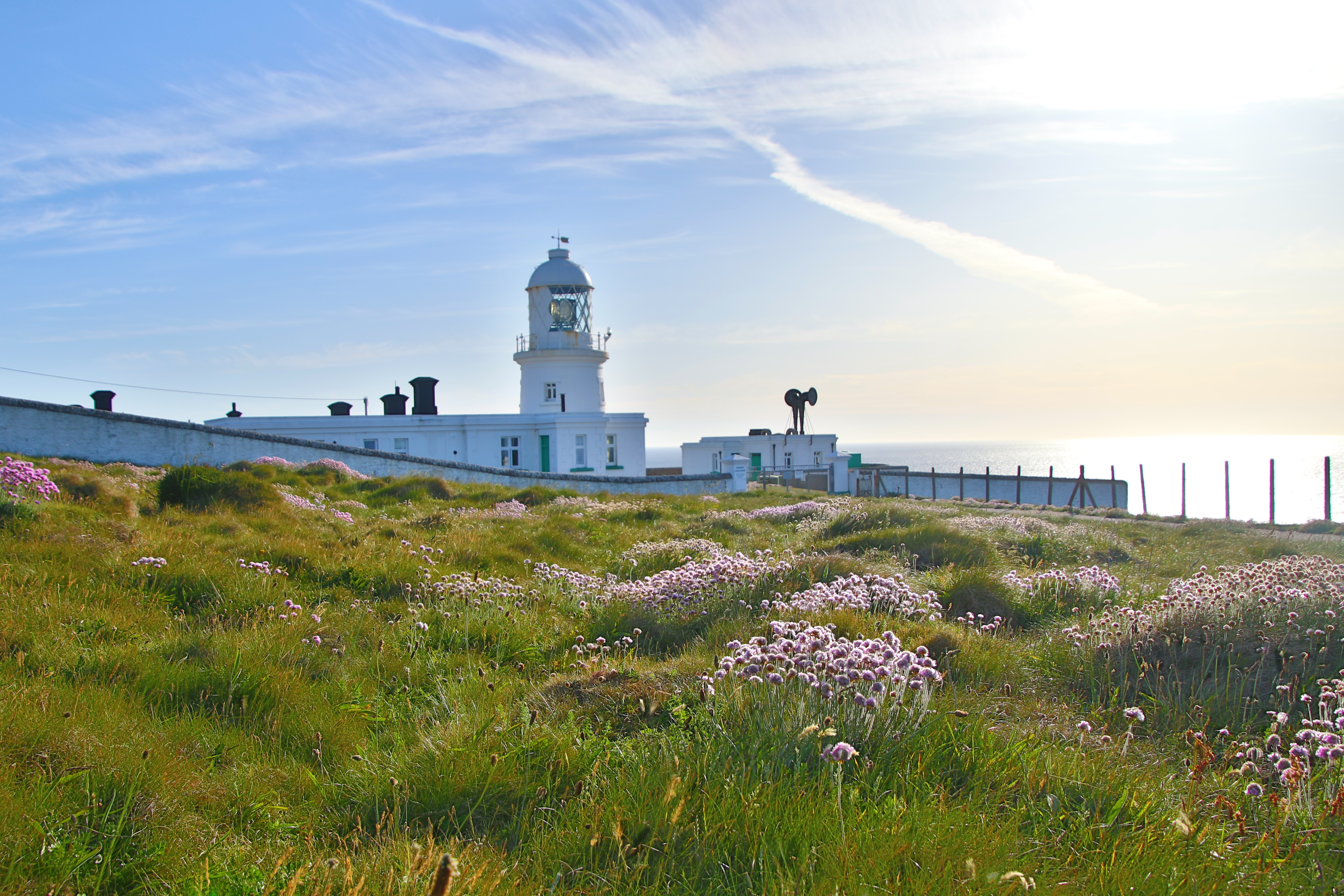
Pendeen Watch lighthouse

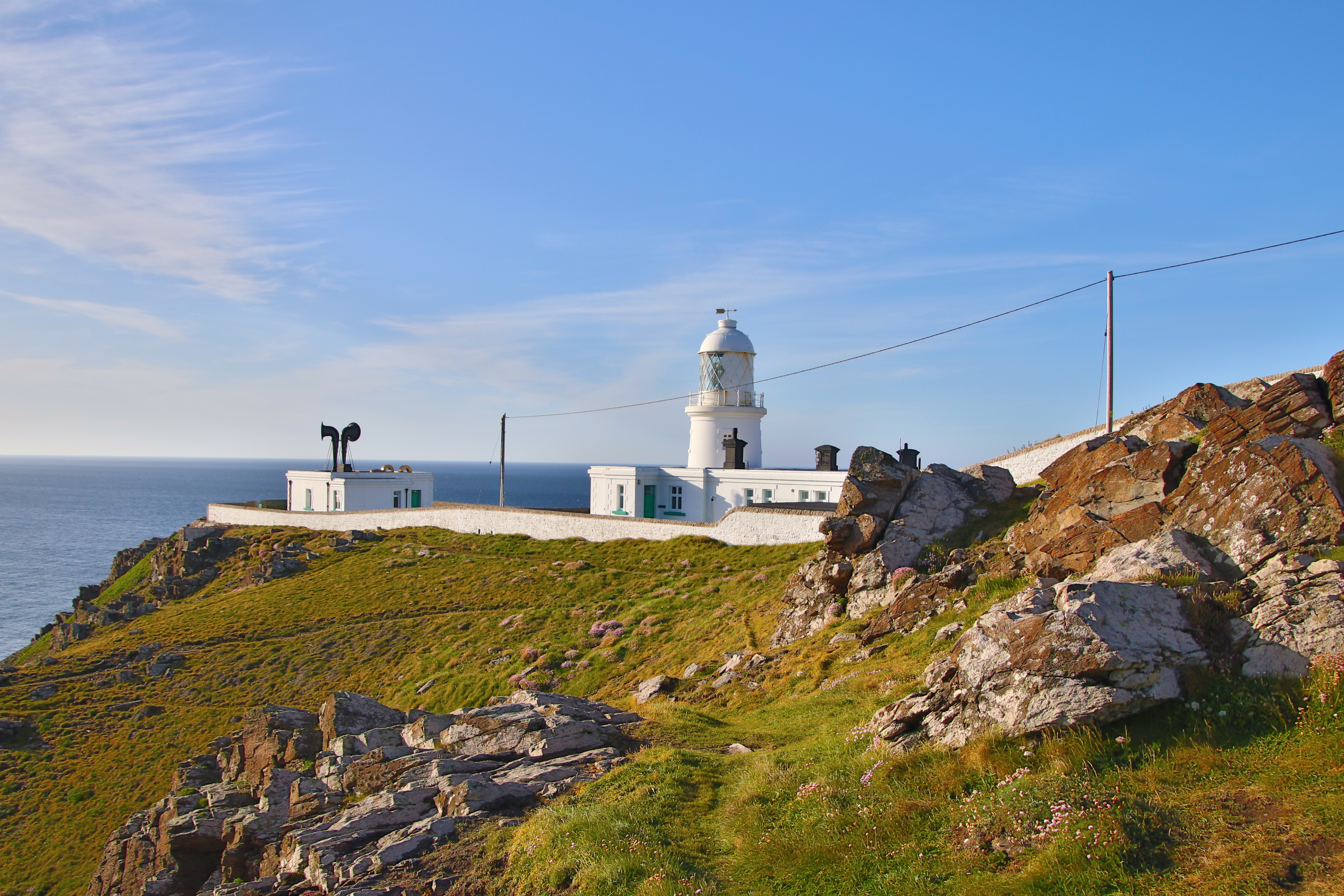
Views of Pendeen Watch lighthouse Cornwall

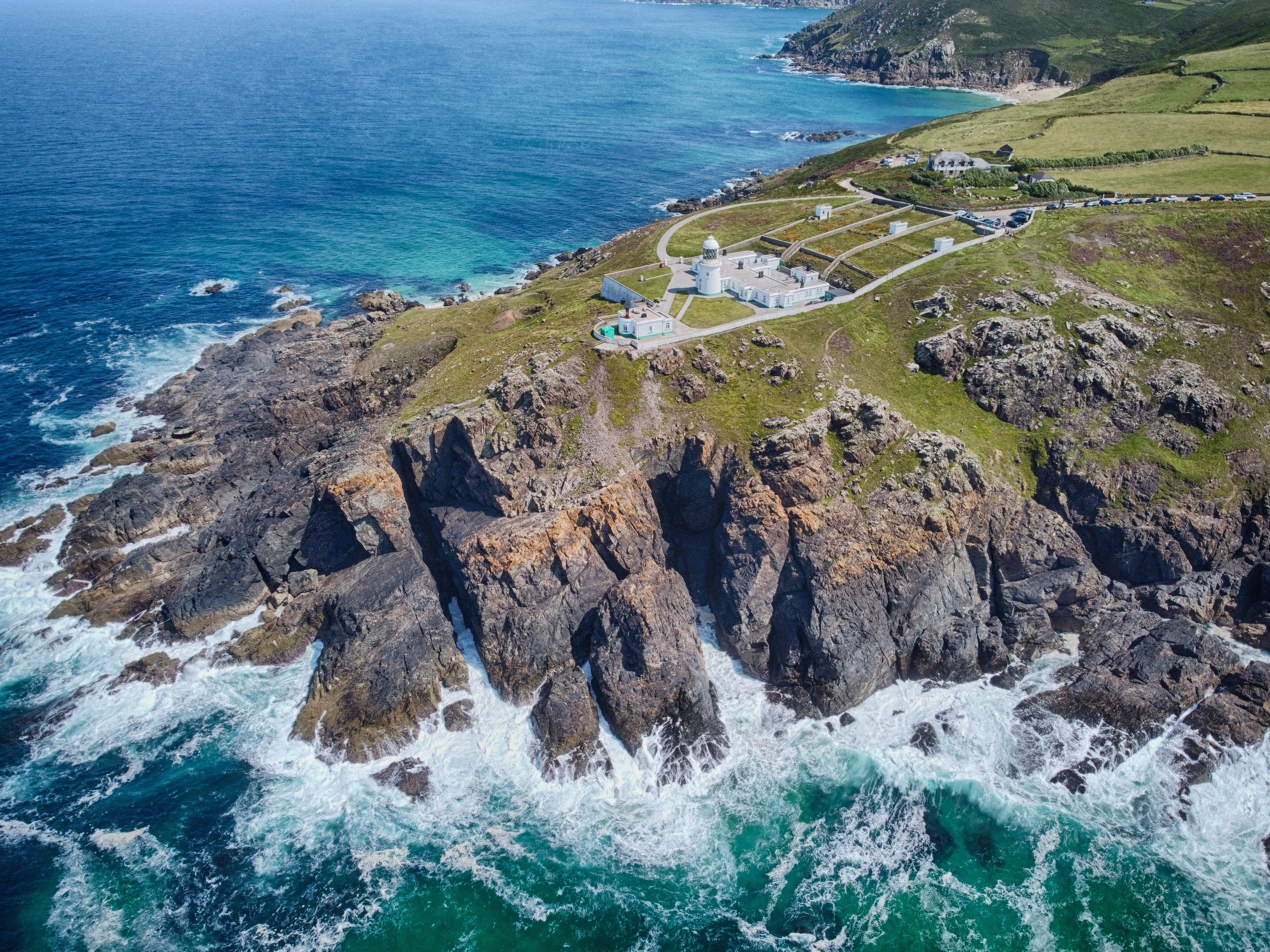
From the air

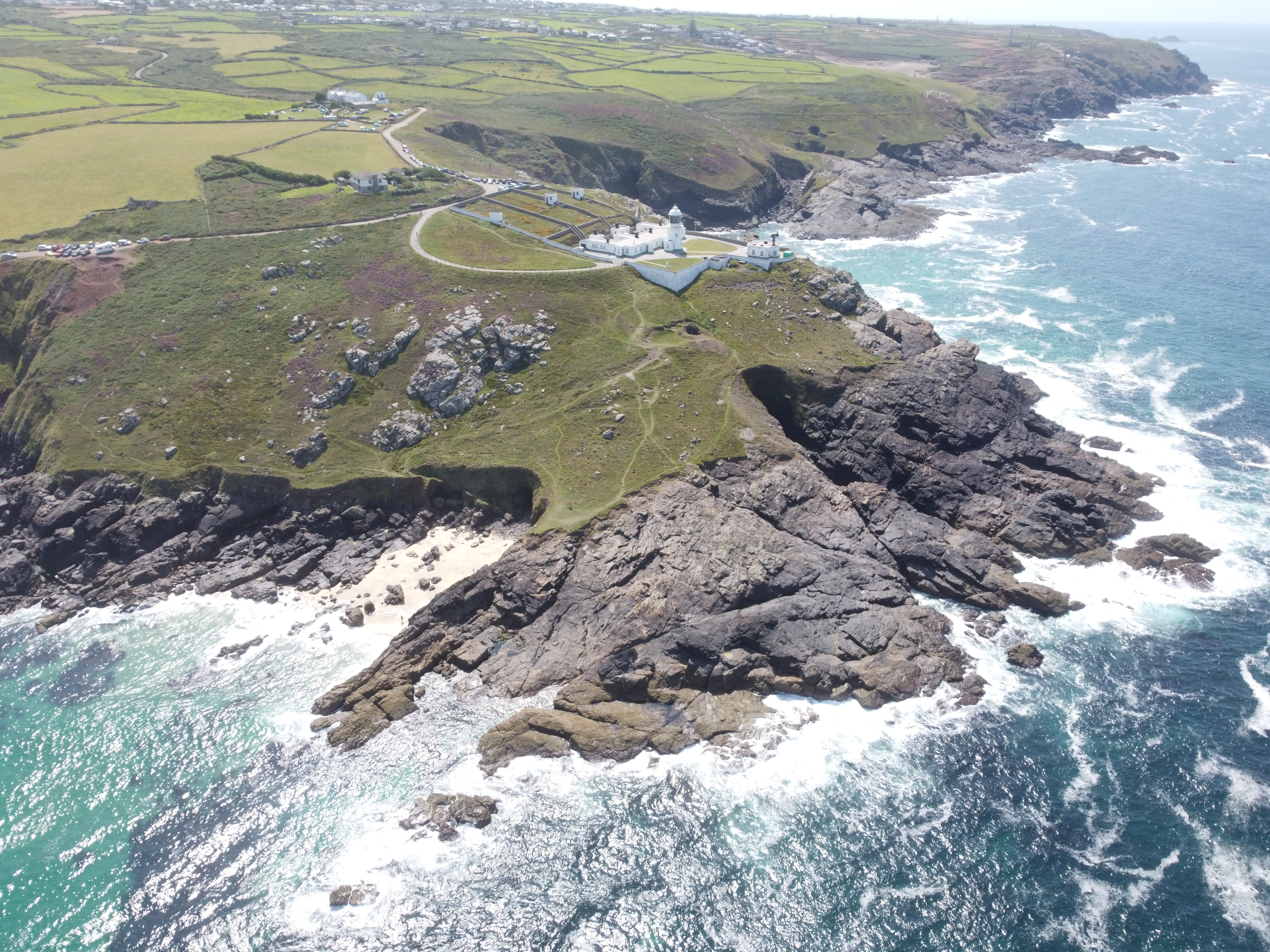
From the air

== See also ==
- List of lighthouses in England
