= Daniel Alexander =

Daniel Alexander may refer to:

- Danny Alexander (born 1972), Scottish politician
- Daniel Alexander (basketball) (born 1991), American basketball player
- Daniel Asher Alexander (1768–1846), English architect and engineer
- Daniel Robert Alexander (1859–?), American settler and trader in Ethiopia

== See also ==
- Dan Alexander (disambiguation)
- Alexander Daniel McLean, Canadian politician
