= Longstone Lighthouse =

Lighthouse on one of the Farne Islands, England

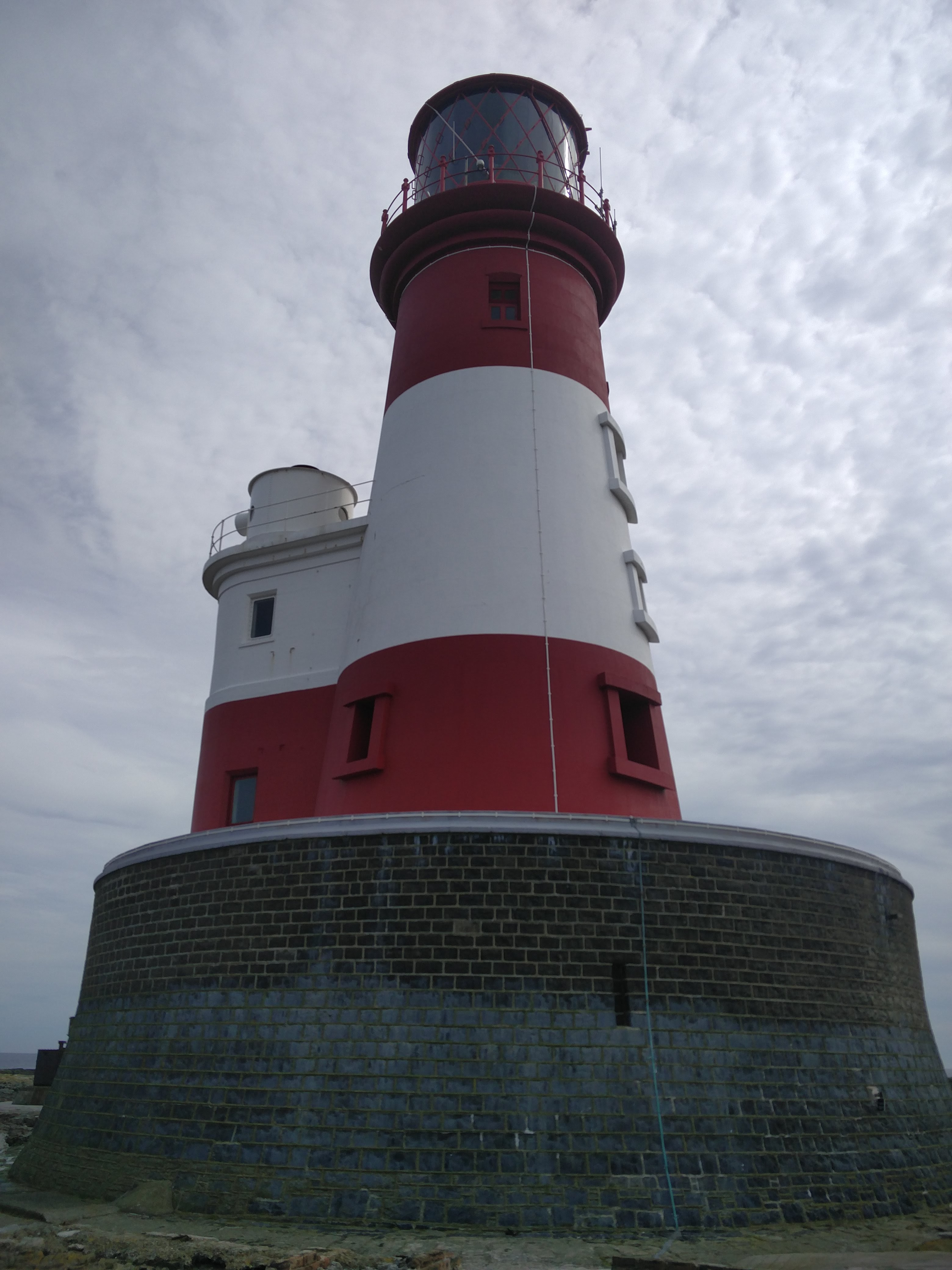
- Longstone Lighthouse
- Location: Longstone Rock; Farne Islands; Northumberland Coast; England
- OS grid: NU2459138983
- Coordinates: 55.643836°N 1.610836°W

Tower
- Constructed: 1826
- Foundation: stone and rock
- Construction: stone tower
- Automated: 1990
- Height: 26 m (85 ft)
- Shape: tapered cylindrical tower with balcony and lantern
- Markings: red tower with horizontal central white band, red lantern
- Power source: solar power
- Operator: Trinity House
- Heritage: Grade II listed building

Light
- Deactivated: 2015–2016 (modernization)
- Focal height: 23 m (75 ft)
- Lens: small 3rd order catadioptric twin spectacle lens
- Intensity: 116,000 candela
- Range: 18 nmi (33 km)
- Characteristic: Fl W 20s.

Longstone Lighthouse is an active 19th century lighthouse on Longstone Rock in the outer group of the Farne Islands off the Northumberland Coast, England. Completed in 1826, it was originally called the Outer Farne Lighthouse, and complemented the earlier Inner Farne Lighthouse. The lighthouse is best known for the 1838 wreck of the Forfarshire and the role of Grace Darling, the lighthouse keeper's daughter, in rescuing survivors.

== History ==
=== Origins ===
The Farne Islands had a long history of needing a light to warn ships of the many surrounding hazards. In 1673 King Charles II had instructed the landowners (the Dean and chapter of Durham) to grant a licence to Sir John Clayton and George Blake to erect a lighthouse on Inner Farne as part of a proposed network of beacons along the Northumberland coast; however the scheme never came to fruition because the authorities (the Elder Brethren of Trinity House) were unable to persuade its potential beneficiaries (the ship-owning merchants of Newcastle upon Tyne) to contribute to the maintenance of the light. A similar request was made in 1727, and in 1755 Captain John Blackett petitioned to establish a light on Staple Island (which he held on a lease from the Dean and Chapter); but both requests were declined.

Twenty-one years later, however, when Blackett again submitted a proposal, he finally gained permission: this time for a pair of coal-fired beacons, which he built at his own expense: one on Staple Island (for which he constructed a squat stone building which was known as the Pinnacle Lighthouse) and the other on Inner Farne (which he erected on the top of Prior Castell's Tower). These beacons were first lit in December 1778; however the Pinnacle Lighthouse was severely damaged in a storm just six years later. A replacement was built on the adjacent Brownsman Island in 1795 (it too had to be rebuilt following storm damage in 1800).

Robert Darling (grandfather of Grace) had been employed as lighthouse keeper at Staple Island, and he likewise transferred to Brownsman Island in 1795; following Robert's death in 1815 his son William succeeded him as keeper.

In 1806, Trinity House surveyed the islands with a view to taking over the beacons and replacing them with new oil-fuelled lighthouses. By 1811 they had built three, all to a similar design: two on Inner Farne and one on Brownsman. The Brownsman Island Lighthouse, however, proved to be poorly-located for its task and over the following years many ships foundered on the rocks and islands further out to sea. The loss of a succession of ships there in 1823 and 1824 (among them the George and Mary, sunk with the loss of all 100 souls on board) prompted Trinity House to act, and (having purchased the lease of the islands from the Blackett family in 1825) they swiftly moved to construct a new lighthouse on one of the furthest outlying islands: Longstone.

=== The current lighthouse ===
Longstone Lighthouse was designed and built by Joseph Nelson (who fifteen years earlier had worked with Daniel Alexander on building the new Inner Farne and Brownsman lighthouses). Construction was relatively swift, and the new Longstone Lighthouse was first lit on 15 February 1826. The total cost was £4,771. The tower was painted red and displayed, like its predecessor, a revolving light 'showing the full face of a reflector every 30 seconds'; it was equipped with a four-sided rotating array of twelve Argand lamps (three on each side), each mounted within a 21-inch (530 mm) parabolic reflector.

==== William and Grace Darling ====
At the same time, in 1826, William Darling moved with his family from the old lighthouse on Brownsman Island to serve as lighthouse keeper at Longstone. On 7 September 1838 his daughter Grace spotted the paddlesteamer Forfarshire shipwrecked on a nearby rocky island. Grace Darling gained great renown when news of her part in the subsequent rescue attempt became known to the public; she and her father were both later awarded the silver medal for bravery by the Royal National Institution for the Preservation of Life from Shipwreck.

==== Improvements ====
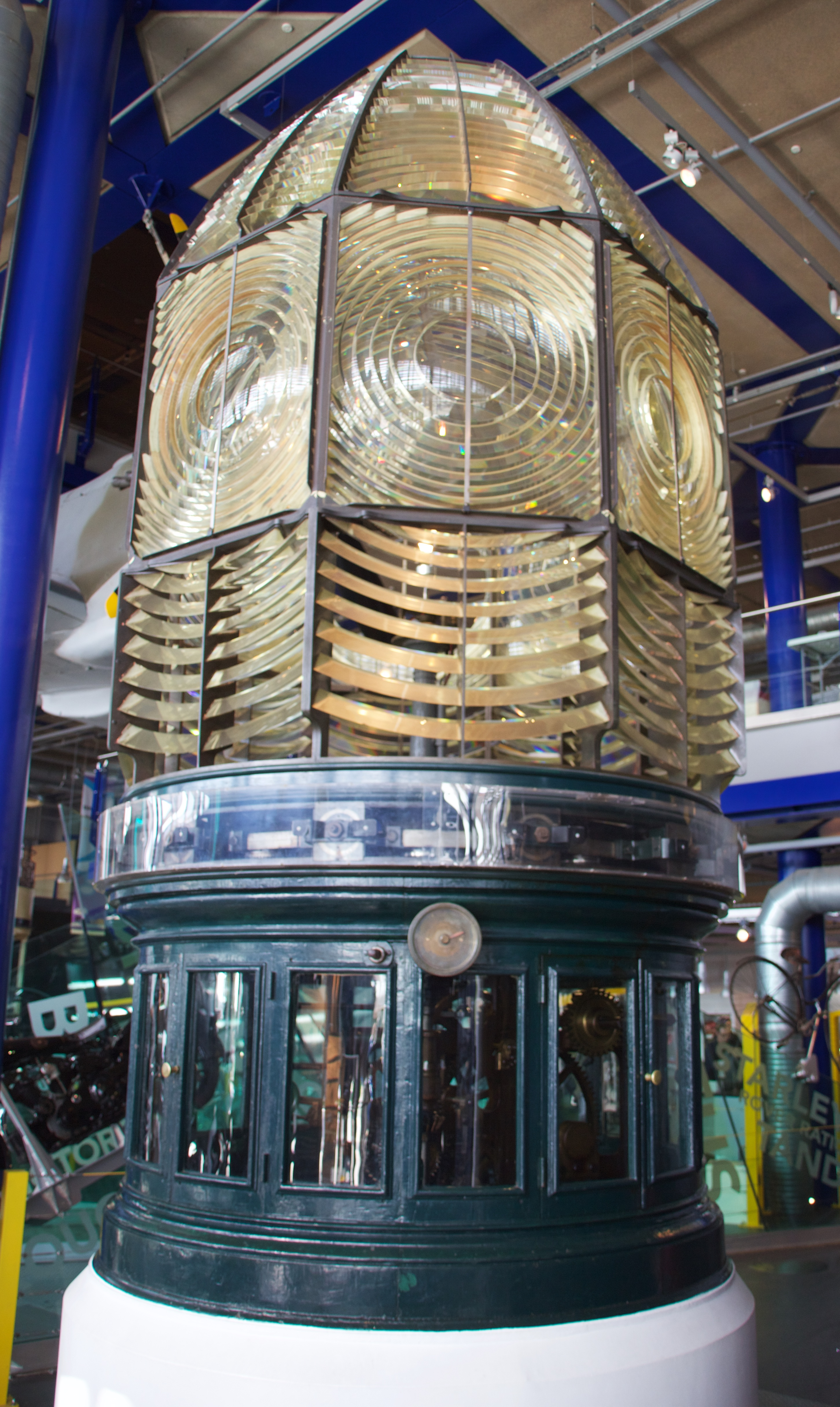
The 1873 optic: in use for almost 80 years, it is now on display at Thinktank, Birmingham Science Museum.

In 1873 the lamp at Longstone was reconfigured and improved with the addition of a new optic by Chance Brothers of Smethwick, made up from a number of Fresnel lens panels, which were used to increase the transmission of light from the lamp The new optic maintained the characteristic of a white flash every thirty seconds.

Further improvements around this time included the introduction of a fog siren in November 1876, powered by a caloric engine, sounding two blasts every two minutes (Late-19th-century photographs show a single horn rising from the roof of the engine house, which had been built within the high wall of the lighthouse compound). Around about 1890 a more powerful siren apparatus was installed, which sounded through a pair of larger vertical trumpets, and compressed air was produced using Blackstone & Co semi-diesel engines.

A horizontal band of white was added to the red-painted tower in 1895.

==== Post-war repairs and electrification ====
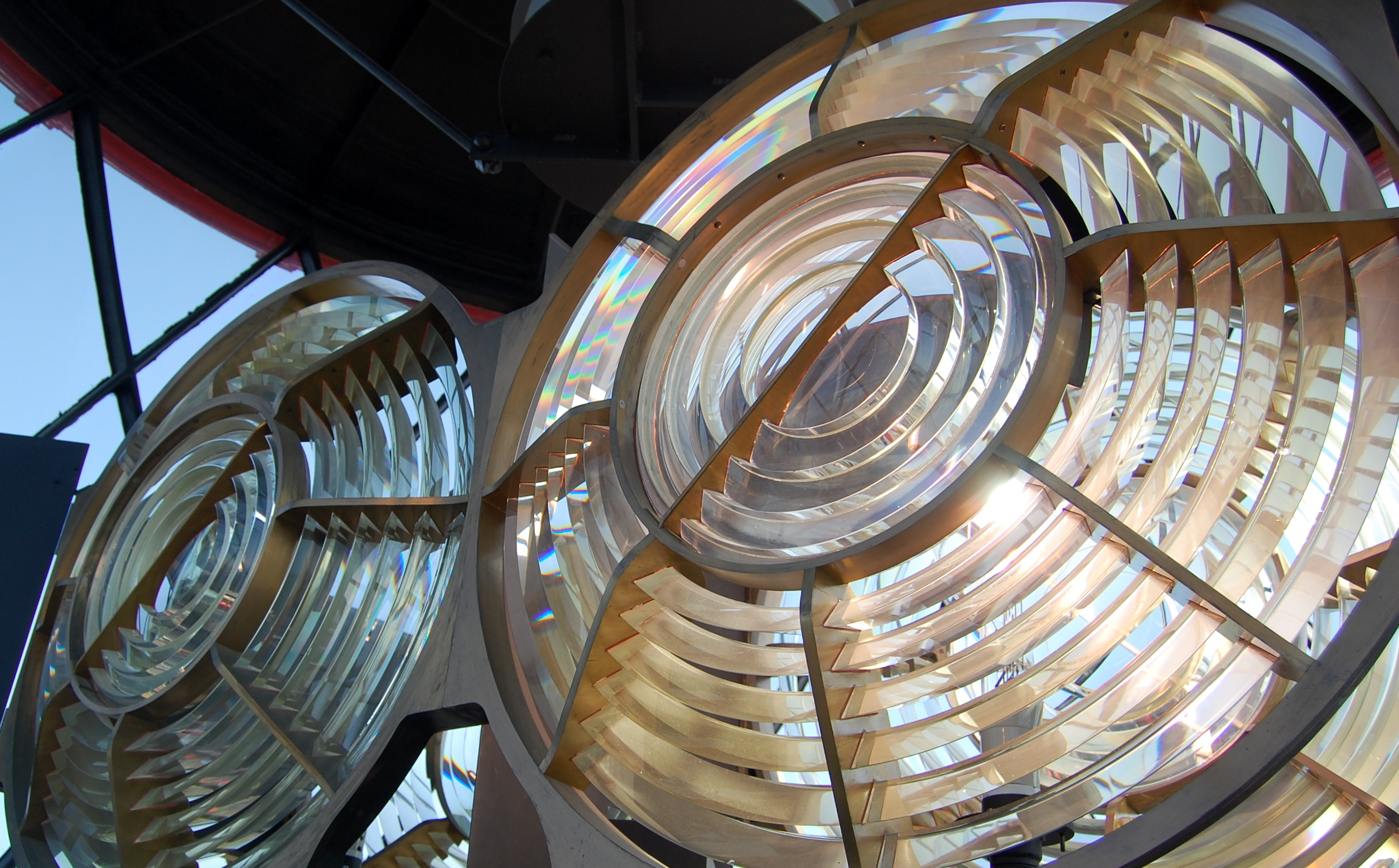
The 1946 optic (since fitted with a pair of LED lamps).

In 1942, during the Second World War, the fog signal house was destroyed by bombing and in 1951 a new keepers' accommodation block was built in its place. This formed part of a comprehensive upgrade, begun in 1946 and only completed in 1952, during which the light was electrified and a new optic (of an unusual 'spectacle' design) was installed (manufactured by Chance Brothers). Each side of the optic contained a 1000-watt light bulb; rotated by clockwork, it flashed once every twenty seconds and was claimed to be one of the most powerful lights on the East Coast. Three single-cylinder and two five-cylinder Gardner diesel engines were installed at this time, to provide electricity for the lamp (by way of three 5.5 kW generator sets) and compressed air for the fog siren (by way of two Reavell compressors). A new, powerful 12-inch (300 mm) siren was provided, sounding from a pair of conical resonators built into a cast iron turret on top of a smaller tower, built alongside the lighthouse itself. Power generated was also supplied to the dwellings and other rooms, and used to charge a reserve battery for emergency use. The works were completed in 1952, whereupon the new equipment became operational. The following year, the old first-order optic was put on display in the new Museum of Science and Industry in Birmingham, the city where it had been manufactured eighty years earlier.

==== Automation ====
In 1990 Longstone Lighthouse became fully automated, and the keepers were withdrawn. Prior to automation an electric fog signal had replaced the siren. Until 2015 the diesel generators at Longstone were run 24 hours-a-day; in that year solar power was introduced, much reducing the site's carbon footprint, and an LED light source was installed within the twin optic (the range of the light having been reduced from 24 to 18 nautical miles or 44 to 33 kilometres and the intensity from 645,000 candelas to 116,000). The generators are now for standby use only.

== Present day ==
Longstone Lighthouse remains in use and is now monitored remotely from the Trinity House Centre at Harwich, Essex. Tours of the lighthouse, which is only accessible by boat, are operated by The Golden Gate Boat Trip Company under licence from Trinity House.

== See also ==
- List of lighthouses in England
