= ALERT (medical facility) =

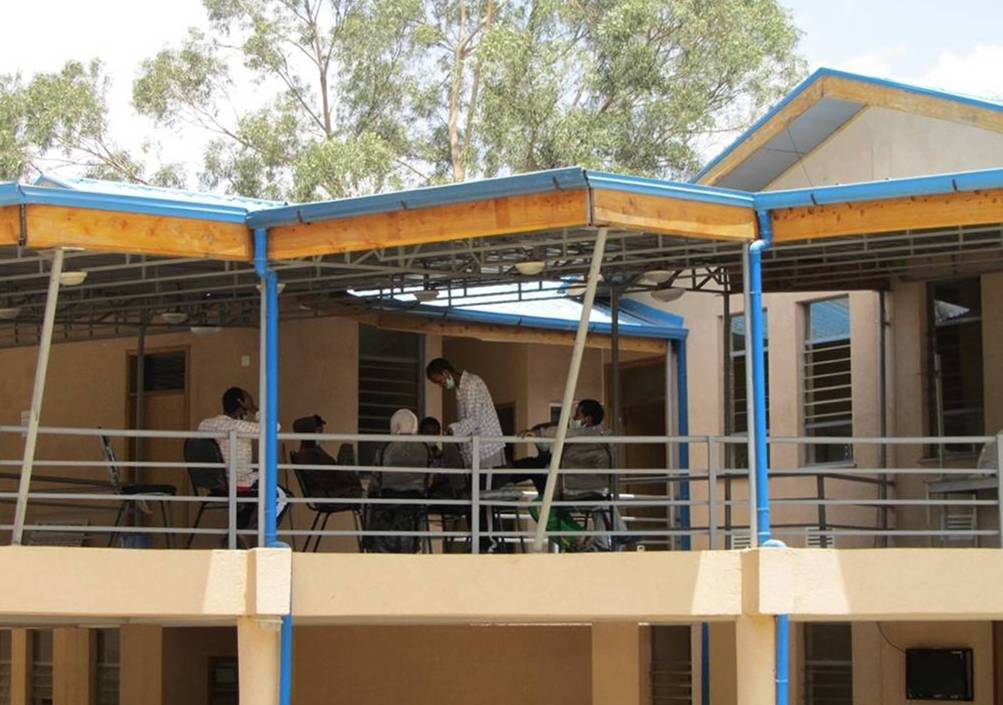

Geography
- Location: Addis Ababa, Ethiopia
- Coordinates: 9°01′22″N 38°44′48″E

Organisation
- Affiliated university: Addis Ababa University

Services
- Beds: 530

History
- Founded: Dr. Thomas Lambie in 1922

Links
- Website: www.alerthospital.gov.et
- Lists: Hospitals in Ethiopia

ALERT is a medical facility on the edge of Addis Ababa, specializing in Hansen's disease, also known as “leprosy”. It was originally the All Africa Leprosy Rehabilitation and Training Center (hence the acronym), but the official name is now expanded to include tuberculosis: All Africa Leprosy, Tuberculosis and Rehabilitation Training Centre.

ALERT's activities focus on its hospital, rehabilitation of leprosy patients, training programs for leprosy personnel from around the world, and leprosy control (administration of the Ethiopian Ministry of Health's regional leprosy control program). From the beginning, ALERT provided leprosy training for medical students from Addis Ababa University. Also at ALERT is the Armauer Hansen Research Institute (AHRI), founded in 1970, specializing in leprosy research. There is currently a 240-bed teaching hospital, which includes dermatology, ophthalmology, and surgery departments, also an orthopedic workshop, and a rehabilitation program.

ALERT is the continuation and expansion of the leprosy hospital originally built by Dr. Thomas Lambie in 1922, which was later named the Princess Zänäbä Wärq Hospital. A memorandum to found ALERT was signed Dec. 11, 1965 by representatives of the Ethiopian Ministry of Health, Addis Ababa University, the International Society for the Rehabilitation of the Disabled, The Leprosy Mission, and Dr. Eugene Kellersberger of the American Leprosy Mission, who had had the vision for establishing such a multifaceted center and had been the main promoter of the project.

== Literature ==
- Unseth, Peter. 2003. "ALERT", Encyclopaedia Aethiopica, vol. 1, edited by Siegbert Uhlig, p. 194,195. Wiesbaden: Harrassowitz.
- Vass, Winifred K. (1999). Doctor Not Afraid, 2nd ed. Dallas, TX (USA).
