= Forfarshire (ship) =

British brigantine rigged paddle steamer

Coordinates: 55.63938°N 1.61911°W

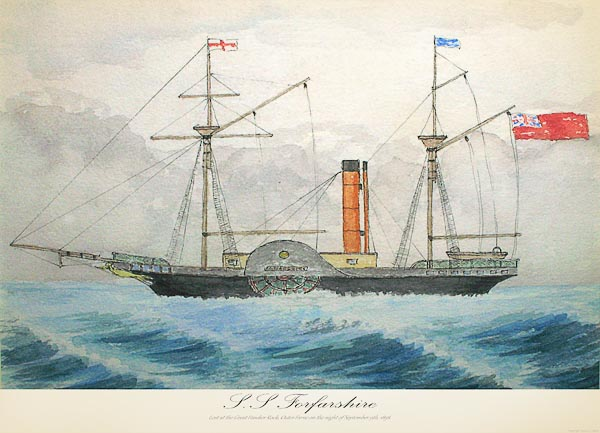
- Contemporary watercolour of SS Forfarshire, circa 1835

History

United Kingdom
- Name: SS Forfarshire
- Namesake: Forfarshire
- Owner: Dundee and Hull Steam Packet Company
- Builder: Thomas Adamson, Dundee
- Cost: £20,000
- Launched: 1834
- In service: 7 May 1836
- Fate: Wrecked, 7 September 1838

General characteristics
- Type: Sidepaddle steamship
- Tonnage: 270 GRT
- Length: 132 ft (40 m)
- Beam: 20 ft (6.1 m)
- Propulsion: 3 × boilers; 2 × 90 hp (67 kW) steam engines
- Sail plan: Brigantine-rigged ship
- Speed: 8–9 knots (15–17 km/h; 9.2–10.4 mph)
- Capacity: First, second, and deck class passengers

Forfarshire was a paddle steamer with brigantine rigging, built in Dundee in 1834, and which struck and later foundered on one of the Farne Islands on 7 September 1838, giving rise to the rescue for which Grace Darling is famed.

== Ship history ==
Forfarshire was commissioned by the Dundee & Hull Shipping Company, to carry passengers and cargo between Hull and Dundee on the east coast of Great Britain. Costing some £20,000, she displaced 400 tons (363 tonnes), was powered by two 90-horsepower (67-kW) steam engines, and had the capability of being powered by sails.

On 5 September 1838, the Forfarshire set out from Hull, sailing north heading for Dundee, with 61 passengers and crew and a cargo of cotton. She had in very recent times had maintenance work undertaken on her boilers. Passing Flamborough Head, a failure of pumps supplying water to the boilers reduced her steaming capacity. Her situation deteriorated through the next day, as leaks from her boilers flooded the bilges, and at 10 pm that night, off St Abb's Head, her engines failed. Despite near gale-force north-easterly winds, her captain put her under sail and continued on his way, but the weather worsened to a full gale, with heavy rain and a change in wind direction to due north. At this, the ship was turned around to run before the wind and seek shelter behind the Farne Islands.

At 3 am on 7 September, she ran aground with considerable force, on Big Harcar (also locally then known and pronounced as "Great Hawker"), one of the Outer Farne Islands. A group of eight sailors and a passenger (Ruthven Ritchie) managed to lower and escape in a lifeboat, to be picked up the following morning by a passing schooner bound for Hull. The remaining passengers and crew were left to the mercy of the sea, which swung the Forfarshire around and tore off the stern quarterdeck and cabins, leaving only the bow and fore sections of the ship anchored to the rock.

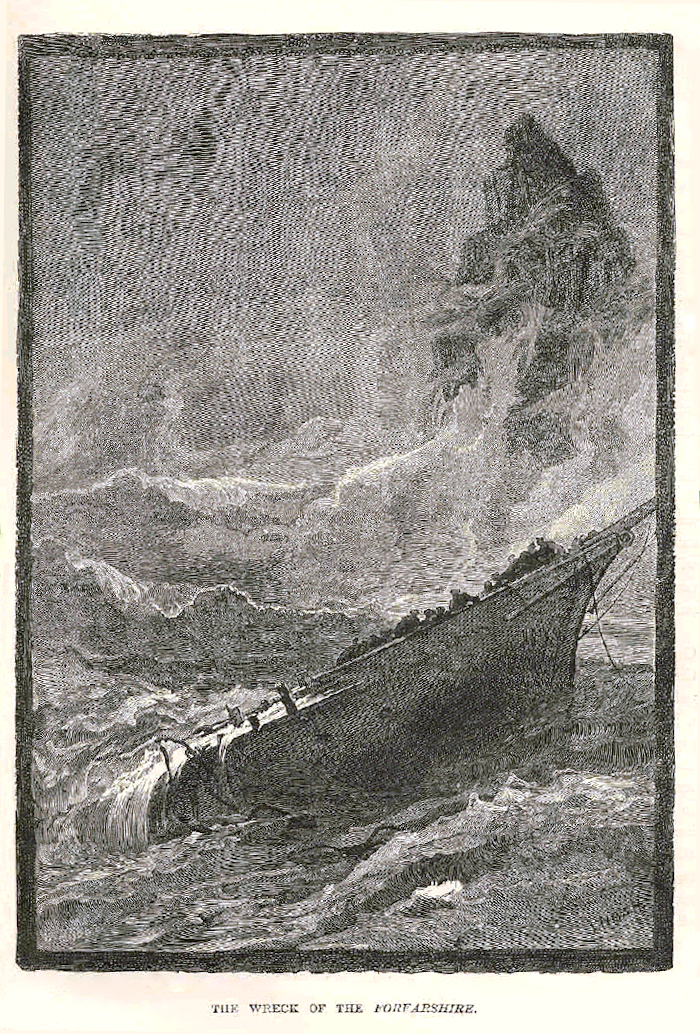
The wrecked bow section of Forfarshire

A few passengers managed to hold on to railings and make it through the night, later transferring to Big Harcar, including Sarah Dawson (a passenger), who was distraught, holding the bodies of her two dead children (James, 7, and Matilda, 5). Their predicament was spotted at first light by Grace Darling, daughter of William, the keeper of the Longstone Lighthouse, which was situated about 600 yards (550 m) from the wreck site. Grace counted 13 people on Big Harcar. Grace pleaded with her father to go to the rescue, but he initially refused on the grounds that the sea was too rough and the two of them could not possibly manage their only boat in such conditions. After a short breakfast, though, Grace prevailed and they set off in their Northumberland coble, a 21-ft clinker-built open rowing boat designed for a minimum crew of three strong men. They rowed for some 1,700 yards, mostly in the lee of Great Harcar. On arrival at the wreck site, they found only nine remaining survivors. William left Grace to hold the boat steady whilst he assisted the transfer of four men and Mrs. Dawson to the boat. William, with the aid of two of the rescued crew, then rowed the boat back to the lighthouse while Grace comforted Mrs. Dawson, who had by this time lost the bodies of her two children to the sea. William and the two strongest of the rescued crew then rowed back to the wreck site and rescued the remaining four survivors. The survivors confirmed that 13 had made it to the rock during the night, but four had been swept away shortly before the arrival of Grace and William. Forty-three passengers and crew, including the captain and his wife, perished. Both William and Grace received the Royal National Lifeboat Institution’s Silver Medal in 1838 - the first recipients of this new award. They also received the Gold Medallion from the Royal Humane Society, while Grace additionally received silver medals from the Glasgow Humane Society and the Edinburgh and Leith Humane Society.

A first inquest on 11 September found that the ship was "wrecked due to the imperfections of the boilers and the culpable negligence of Captain Humble" - in part a reference to Humble's decision to press on with the voyage rather than put into port after the initial failure at Flamborough Head; a second inquest on 1 October - to which the shipping line had had time to dispatch a representative - watered down the findings to the tempestuousness of the weather.

Some remains of the Forfarshire woodwork can be found at Piper Gut in depths from 7 to 22 m (3.8-12 fathoms), but mixed with remains from other wrecks, on a rock and kelp sea floor. A plaque can be found on the side of Minerva Terrace at Hull Marina commemorating the voyage. The marina entrance was once the entrance for the docks from where the Forfarshire sailed. One of the original nameplates of Forfarshire is now on display in the main bar of the Olde Ship Inn at Seahouses.

Behind the altar of Dunkeld Cathedral, a plaque is erected "To the memory of Rev John Robb who, on a voyage for the benefit of his health, perished by the wreck of the Forfarshire Steamship off the Fern Islands". Robb had been the minister of Dunkeld for two years.

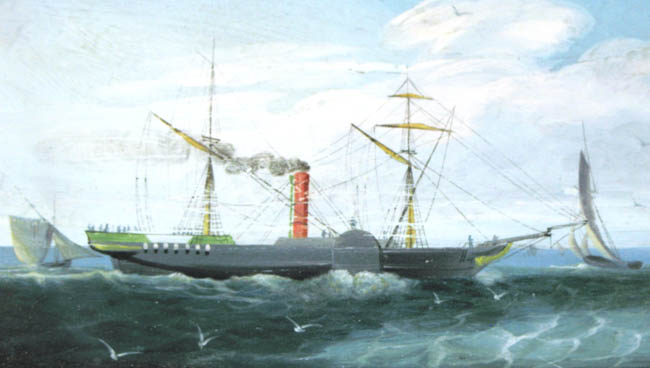
Forfarshire from a contemporary painting
