= Baraka Bible Presbyterian Church =

Church in Bethlehem, West Bank, Palestine

Baraka Bible Presbyterian Church is a reformed and fundamental Bible Presbyterian church located in Bethlehem and Shepherd's Field. The first and only Bible Presbyterian Church in historic Palestine, it is often attended by Pilgrims who visit the Holy Land. The sale of its original compound, Beit El Baraka, has been the subject of an international fraud case. The pastor is the Rev George Awad.

== History ==
Baraka Bible Presbyterian Church was established in 1946 by Dr Thomas Alexander Lambie (1885–1954) of the Independent Board for Presbyterian Foreign Missions of the United States. He and his wife established a sanatorium with 90 beds in Aroub, about 13 kilometres (8 mi) south of Bethlehem. At the same time they built a church in the town and a church in Bethlehem. The church adheres to the Westminster Confession and the Apostles Creed.

In 1954, the first service in the new building was conducted by Tabra Khalil, one of the local Arab elders. Land was purchased for building a church center in Shepherd's Field Town.

In 1985, the church's pastor the Rev George Habeeb Awad was ordained by the Bible-Presbyterian Church of Singapore.

== Premises ==
The old church compound is made up of eight buildings built from Jerusalem yellow stone.

== International fraud sale ==
Beit El Baraka operated first as a hospital and then as a pilgrim hostel from 1995. When this proved to be unsustainable, the property was sold.

The Scandinavian Seamen Holy Land Enterprise, which claimed to be a church group based in Haifa and pretended to be a Swedish company, was established in 2007 in Stockholm. They claimed that their plan was to restore the church and revive it as a place of worship. Once purchased, the group registered the building with the Civil Administration and received all necessary approvals. Following this approval, the Swedish group announced its dissolution, with the church being its only asset.

The sale was condemned by Swedish officials.

An investigative report by Israeli newspaper Haaretz in May alleged that an American millionaire, Irving Moskowitz, purchased the site through a Swedish company in 2012 with the intention of turning it into a settlement outpost. Orthodox Archbishop Atallah Hanna was among a number of political and religious leaders who protested.
