= Farne Lighthouse =

Lighthouse in Northumberland, England

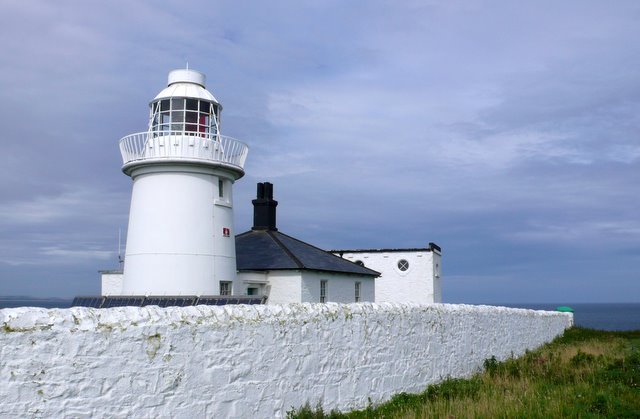
- Farne Lighthouse
- Location: Farne Islands; Northumberland; England
- OS grid: NU2177735811
- Coordinates: 55°36′55.3″N 1°39′20.6″W

Tower
- Constructed: 1776 (first)
- Construction: brick tower
- Automated: 1910
- Height: 13 m (43 ft)
- Shape: cylindrical tower with balcony and lantern
- Markings: white tower and lantern
- Operator: National Trust (Farne Islands National Nature Reserve)
- Heritage: Grade II listed building

Light
- First lit: 1811 (current)
- Focal height: 27 m (89 ft)
- Lens: 3rd order catadioptric fixed lens
- Light source: LED
- Intensity: 1,650 candela
- Range: 8 nmi (15 km; 9.2 mi)
- Characteristic: Fl (2) WR15s.

Farne Lighthouse is a lighthouse on the southern tip of Inner Farne (one of a group of islands off the coast of North Northumberland). Built in the early 19th century, it still functions as a lighthouse and is managed by Trinity House (England's general lighthouse authority). In 1910 it was one of the first Trinity House lighthouses to be automated.

== History ==
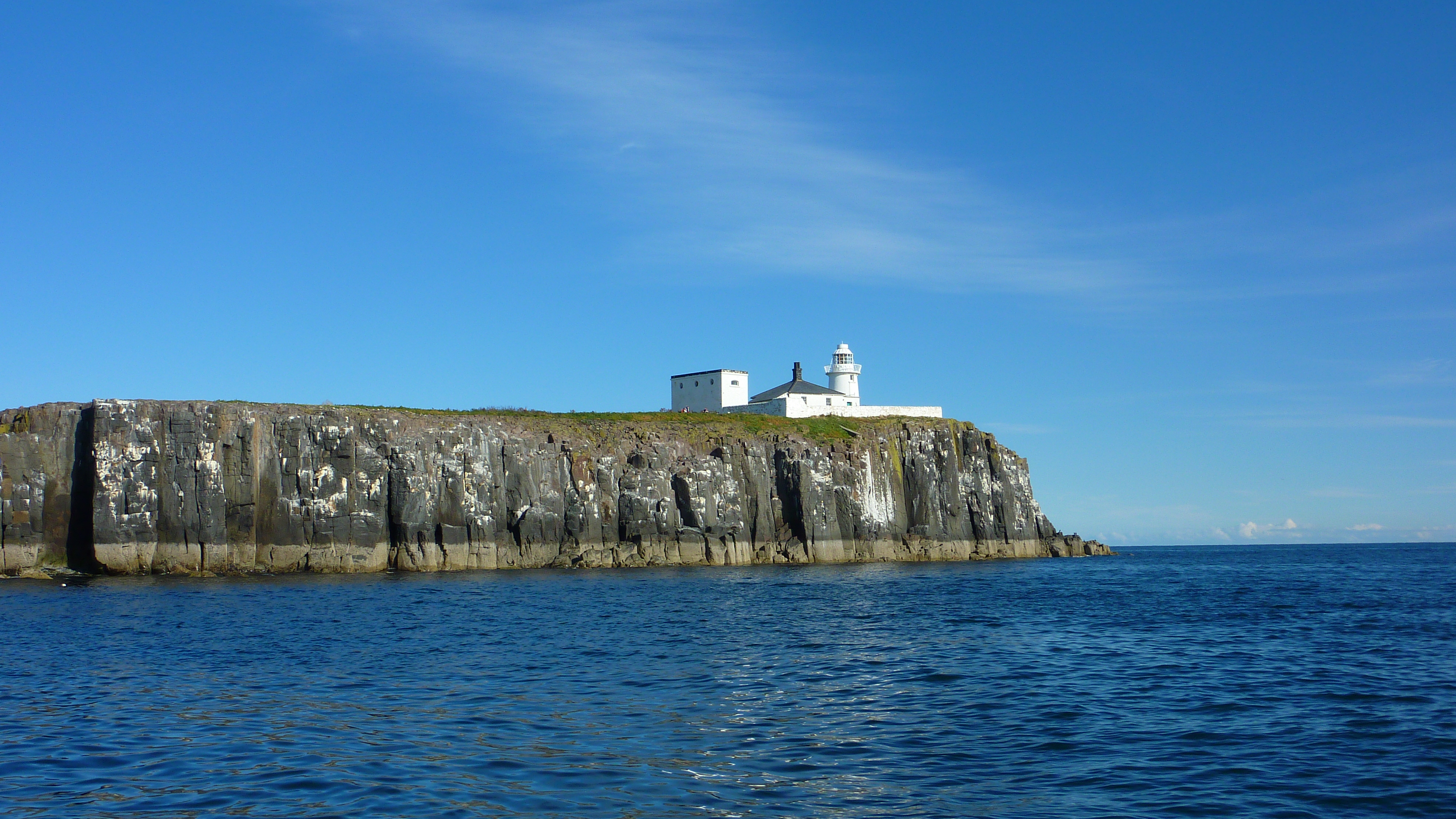
The lighthouse seen from the sea.

Farne Lighthouse was one of a pair built on Inner Farne by the Corporation of Trinity House in 1811, both of which were designed by Daniel Alexander to replace an earlier coal-burning light which had been established on the island by Captain John Blackett in 1778.

Farne Lighthouse (originally named Farne High Lighthouse) is a cylindrical white tower, 13 m (43 ft) tall with a lighthouse keeper's cottage attached to its base. It was initially provided with a revolving array of seven Argand lamps and reflectors, which displayed a single white flash every 30 seconds. In 1910 it was converted to run automatically on acetylene; the gas was manufactured in an adjacent producer plant and controlled by a sun valve. A new fixed third order Fresnel lens was installed in the lantern and a red sector was added to the main light to indicate lines of approach that were hazardous for shipping. (That same year saw the nearby Bamburgh Lighthouse established, with a sector light that worked in conjunction with the Inner Farne light.) This arrangement largely remains in place, except that in 1996 the light was converted from acetylene to solar powered electric operation.

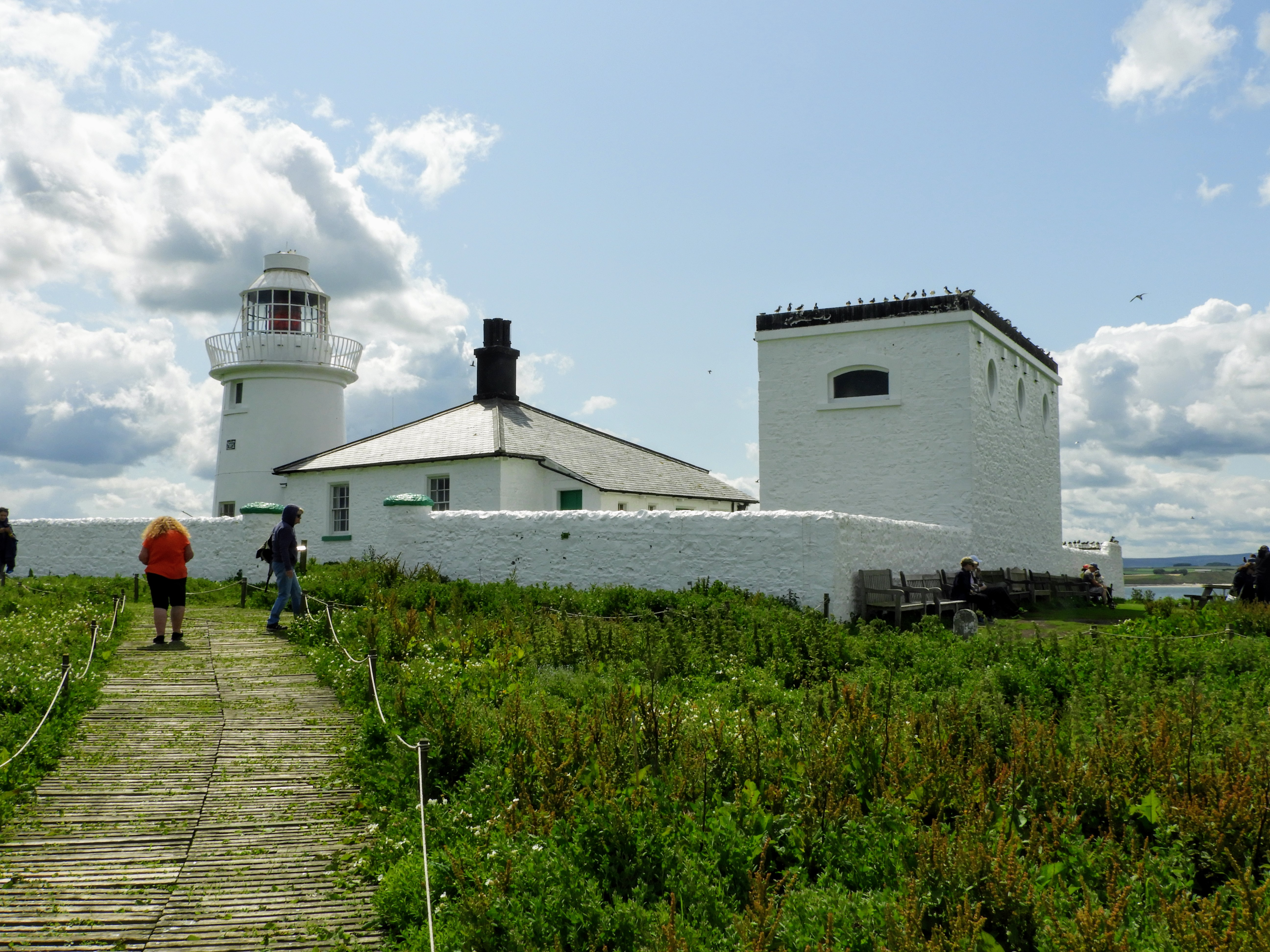
Lighthouse, former dwelling and acetylene plant (left-right).

The other lighthouse on the island (Farne Low Lighthouse) was an octagonal tower, 8 m (26 ft) tall, placed 150 m (490 ft) away from the first, close to the north-west tip of the island. It served to warn shipping of the Megstone, an isolated rocky island lying (in line with the two lights) just under a mile away to the north-west. Whereas the High Light revolved, the Low Light showed a fixed beam from a single Argand lamp and reflector; it was monitored by the keeper at the High Lighthouse, the light being made visible through a small aperture in the rear of the Low Lighthouse.

After the High Light had been modified and automated in 1910, use of the Low Light was discontinued; before long it was demolished along with most of the keepers' accommodation (which was now no longer needed).

=== Associated lighthouses ===
In 1811, at the same time as it was building the two lighthouses on Inner Farne, Trinity House also built a new lighthouse on one of the outer Farne Islands: Brownsman Island. This light was also designed by Daniel Alexander and was similar to the other two in appearance and layout but taller; it too was equipped with a revolving set of lamps and reflectors. It likewise replaced an earlier light built by Captain Blackett in 1778 (on nearby Staple Island, but subsequently relocated to Brownsman). The 1811 installation on Brownsman Island was itself later moved to a more effective position on Longstone Island, further out to sea; named Longstone Lighthouse, it too remains active as an aid to navigation for Trinity House.

== Present day ==
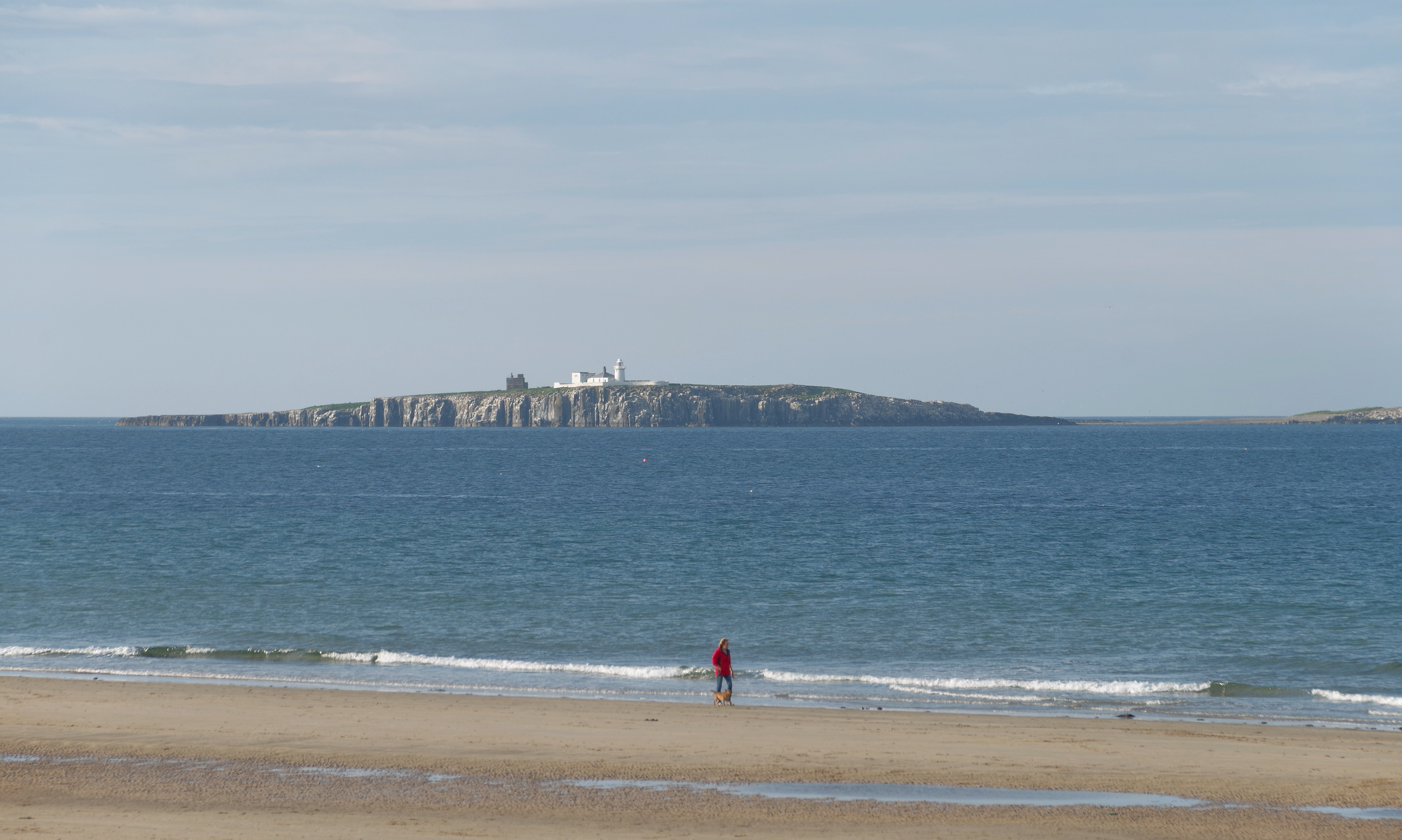
As viewed from Seahouses.

The tower is 13 m (43 ft) tall with a range for the light of 8 nautical miles (15 km; 9.2 mi). Farne Island Lighthouse was sold on 6 June 2005 to the National Trust for £132,000; nevertheless it remains an operational lighthouse, with relevant areas of the building having been leased back to Trinity House for a peppercorn rent. In 2022 permission was given for the lamp to be replaced with an LED light source, designed to function within the original lens; this upgrade was completed in March 2022.

== See also ==
- List of lighthouses in England
