= Lighthouses on Lundy =

Lundy Lighthouses
- Location: Lundy, United Kingdom
- Lundy Old Light
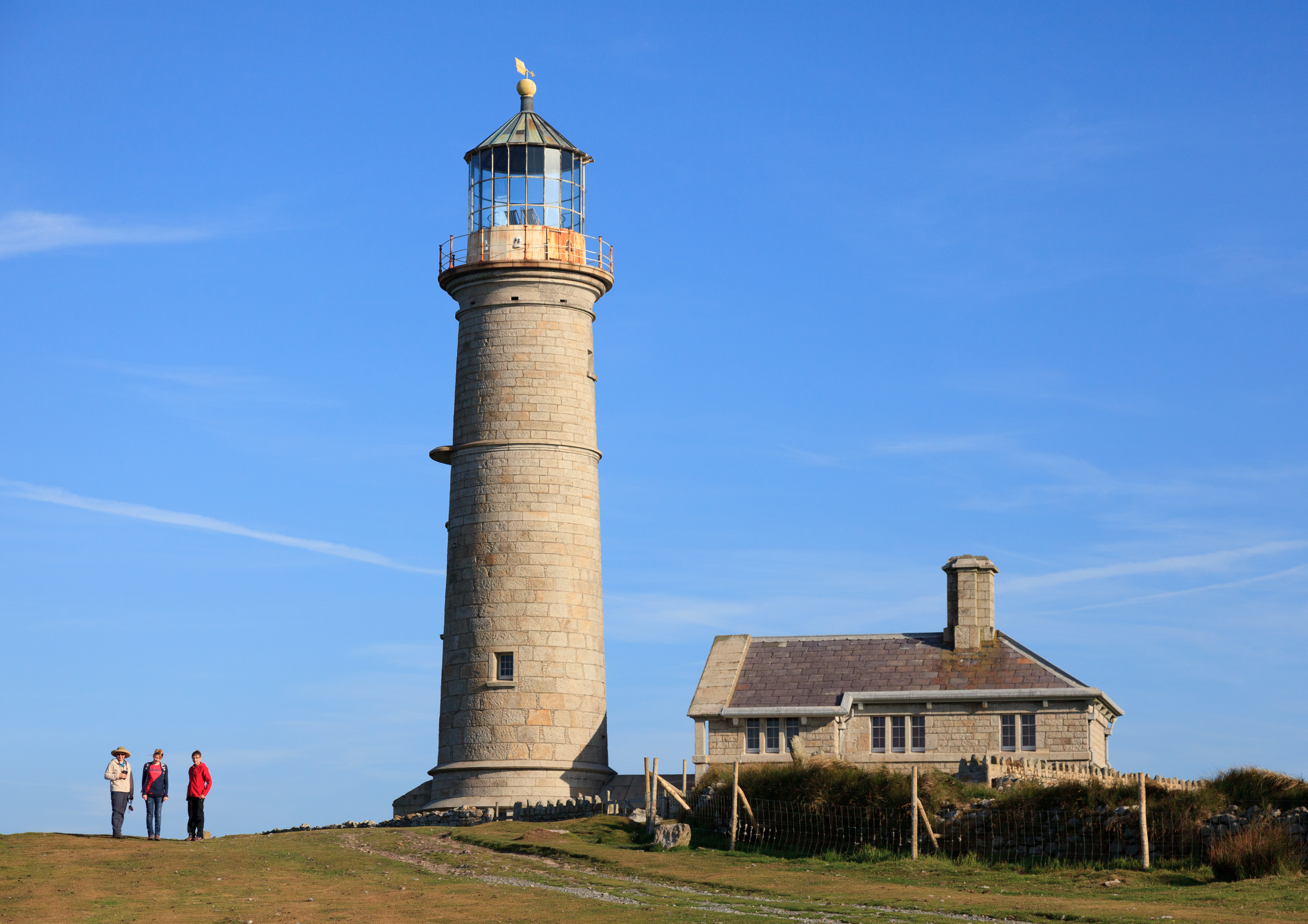
- The old lighthouse and attached keepers' accommodation.
- Coordinates: 51°10′02″N 4°40′24″W
- Constructed: 1820
- Designed by: Daniel Asher Alexander
- Construction: stone
- Height: 29 m (95 ft)
- Operator: Trinity House (–1897)
- Heritage: Grade II* listed building, scheduled monument
- Deactivated: 1897
- Focal height: 164 m (538 ft)
- Lundy North Lighthouse
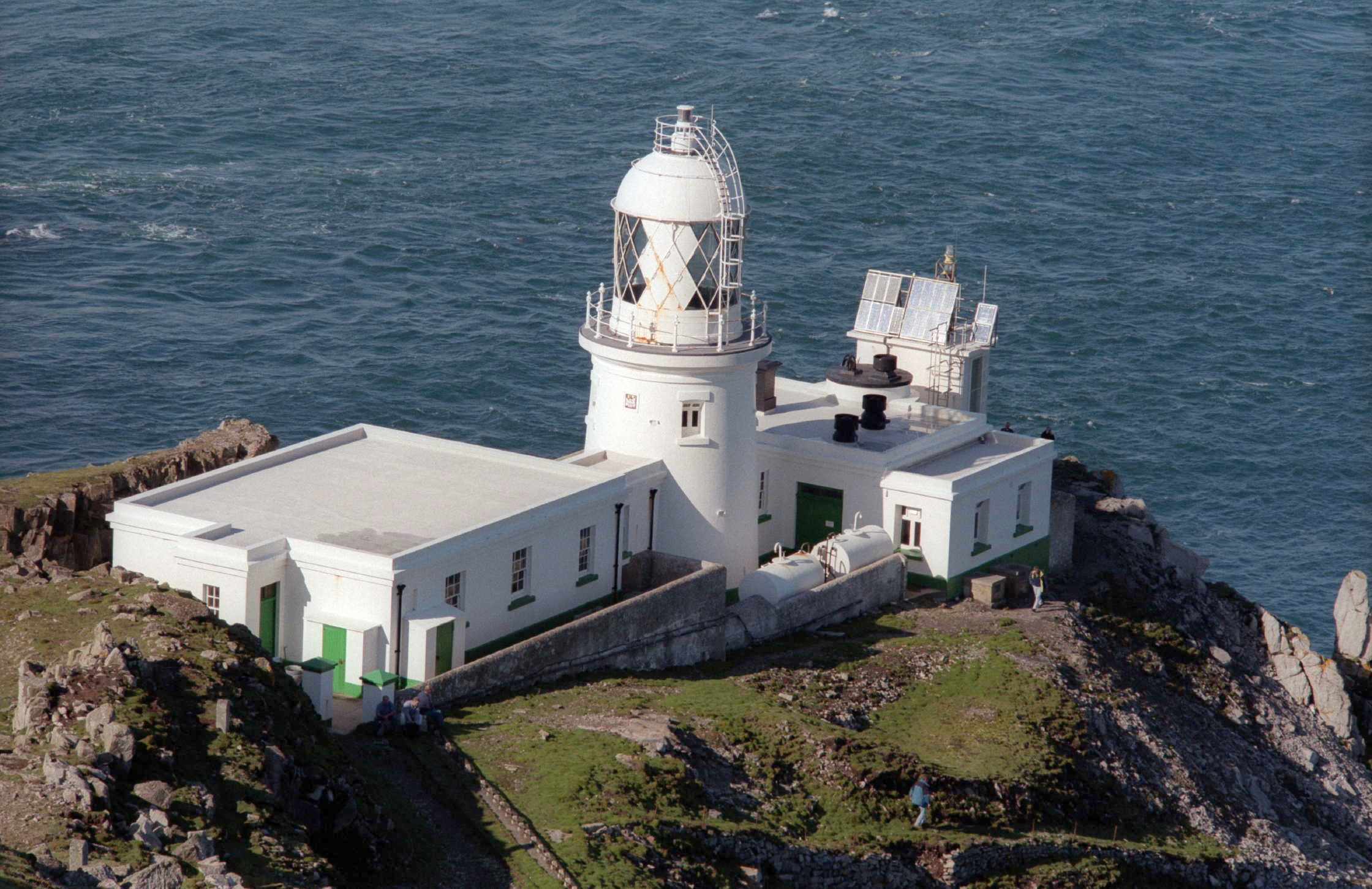
- Lundy North lighthouse, with 1990s solar panels and optic on top of the old tannoy stack.
- Coordinates: 51°12′06″N 4°40′38″W
- Constructed: 1897
- Construction: brick
- Automated: 1985, 1976
- Height: 17 m (56 ft)
- Shape: cylinder
- Markings: White
- Operator: Trinity House
- Heritage: Grade II listed building
- Focal height: 48 m (157 ft)
- Lens: first order Fresnel lens (1897–1971), fourth order Fresnel lens (1971–1991)
- Intensity: 16,154 candela
- Range: 18 nmi (33 km; 21 mi)
- Characteristic: Fl W 15s
- Lundy South Lighthouse
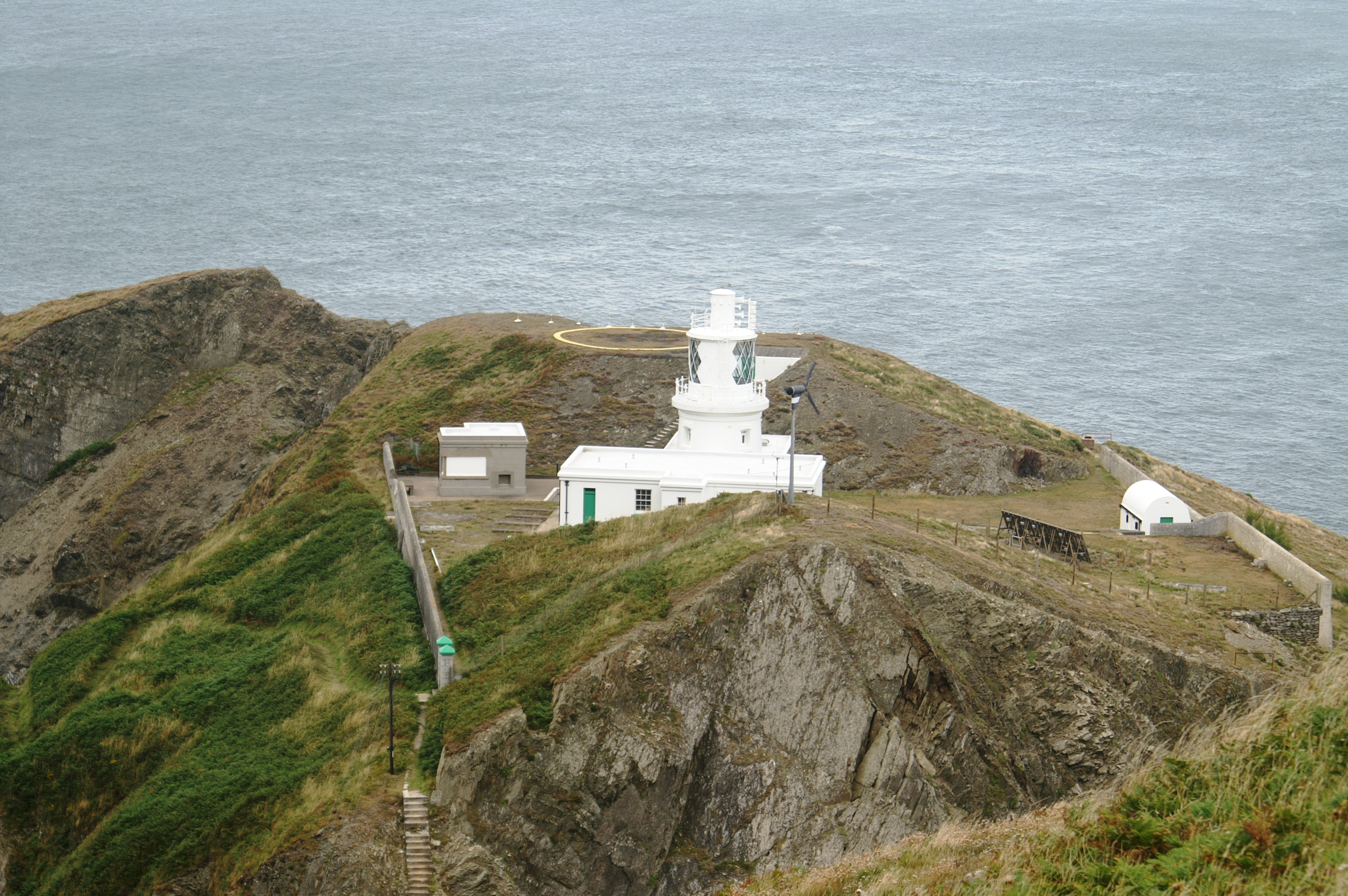
- Coordinates: 51°09′43″N 4°39′21″W
- Constructed: 1897
- Construction: brick
- Automated: 1985
- Height: 16 m (52 ft)
- Shape: cylinder
- Markings: White
- Operator: Trinity House
- Heritage: Grade II listed building
- Focal height: 53 m (174 ft)
- Lens: first order Fresnel lens (1897–1962), fourth order Fresnel lens (1962–1994)
- Intensity: 13,000 candela
- Range: 15 nmi (28 km; 17 mi)
- Characteristic: Fl W 5s

The isle of Lundy has three lighthouses: a pair of active lights built in 1897 and a preserved older lighthouse dating from 1819.

The old lighthouse (together with the adjacent keepers' accommodation) is a Grade II* listed building and the tower is a scheduled monument. An associated fog signal battery is also a scheduled monument containing several Grade II listed structures. The North and South lighthouses are also Grade II listed buildings.

The Old Light and its associated keepers' house are today kept open by the Landmark Trust. The North and South lighthouses are run and maintained by Trinity House, the general lighthouse authority for England and Wales; nowadays they are fully automated, and monitored via a telemetry link from Harwich.

== Old light ==
Foundations for a lighthouse on Lundy were laid in 1787, but the first Lundy Lighthouse (now known as the Old Light) was not built until Trinity House obtained a 999-year lease in 1819. The 97-foot (30-metre) granite tower, on the summit of Chapel Hill, was designed by Daniel Asher Alexander, and built by Joseph Nelson at a cost of £36,000. Because the site, Beacon Hill, is 469 ft (143 m) above sea level, the highest base for a lighthouse in Britain, the light was often obscured by fog. Even on occasions when the island itself was free from fog, it was reported that 'the lighthouse stands so high that it is capped by fog'.

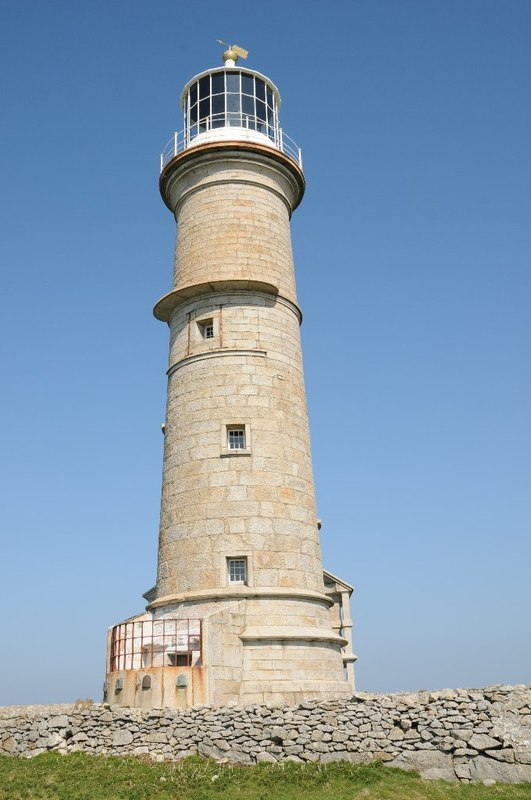
The old lighthouse, with remains of the lower light room (bottom left), relocated from its original position beneath the sill, halfway up the tower.

The lighthouse had two lights: the lower a fixed white light and the upper a quick flashing white light, showing every 60 seconds (both lights were provided by Argand lamps fitted with parabolic reflectors). The flashing characteristic was an innovation at the time, however, the speed of revolution gave the impression it was a fixed light with no flashes detectable. This, combined with poor visibility, may have contributed to the grounding, at Cefn Sidan, of the La Jeune Emma, bound from Martinique to Cherbourg in 1828. 13 of the 19 on board drowned, including Adeline Coquelin, the 12-year-old niece of Napoleon Bonaparte's divorced wife Joséphine de Beauharnais. The following year the lower light was moved from a window part-way down the tower into a new lantern room at the base of the tower, with the hope that this would be less affected by fog.

Ongoing attempts were made to improve the quality of the main light. In 1842 a new rotating optic was installed: manufactured by Cookson & Co. of Newcastle, it combined dioptric lenses with mirrors and displayed a white flash every two minutes. This arrangement was replaced in 1857 by a large (first-order) 8-sided revolving catadioptric optic manufactured by Chance Brothers giving the light a range (in fine weather) of over 30 nautical miles (55 kilometres). It was lit by a Trinity-pattern four-wick oil burner. (The following year, the dioptric section of the old 1842 optic was refurbished and installed in South Bishop Lighthouse.)

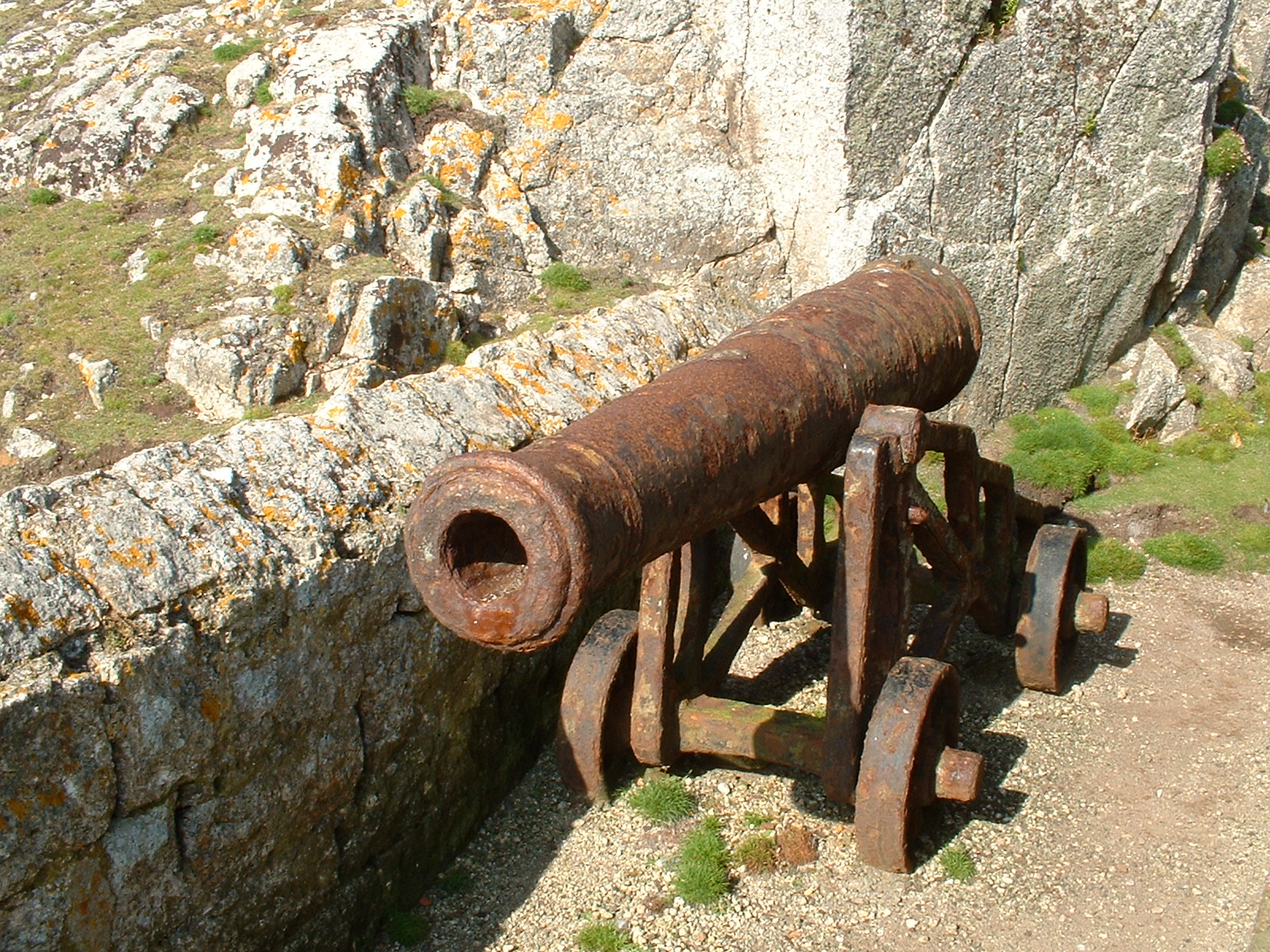
One of the old cannons at the former fog battery.

Around 1861 a Fog Signal Battery was built on the cliffs on the west coast of the island. It was equipped with a pair of 18-pound guns, which were sounded once every fifteen minutes in foggy weather (changed to once every ten minutes in 1876). Guncotton rockets replaced these fog signal guns in 1878.

Further attempts at improving the light were made in 1889, when the frequency of the flash was increased to once every minute from once every two.

=== Decommissioning ===
As early as 1857, it had been suggested that seafarers would be better served by provision of 'low lighthouses on [the] north and south extremities of island, one with bell, the other with gong or cannon'. Eventually, owing to the ongoing complaints about the difficulty of sighting the light in fog, Lundy Lighthouse (along with its fog battery) was indeed deactivated in 1897, and replaced by a new pair of lights: Lundy North and Lundy South (each with its own distinctive fog signal). The unlit tower was however retained in order to serve as a daymark.

At the time of the decommissioning there were five Trinity House keepers living on the island, together with their wives and children: three at the lighthouse and two at the fog battery. The new lighthouses, however, were classed as 'rock stations' (unlike the old light), which meant that keepers' families would no longer be accommodated on site.

== New lights ==
Designed by Sir Thomas Matthews, the current Lundy North and Lundy South lighthouses were built in 1897 at the north-west and south-east extremities of the island, to replace the Old Light. At the time of its opening, the North lighthouse in particular was described as being 'at the present moment, the most scientific and most advanced lighthouse in the world'.

Attached to each tower was accommodation for the keepers, who maintained and operated the lights and associated fog signals. Initially, the North Light was staffed by three keepers and the South Light by two.

=== North lighthouse ===
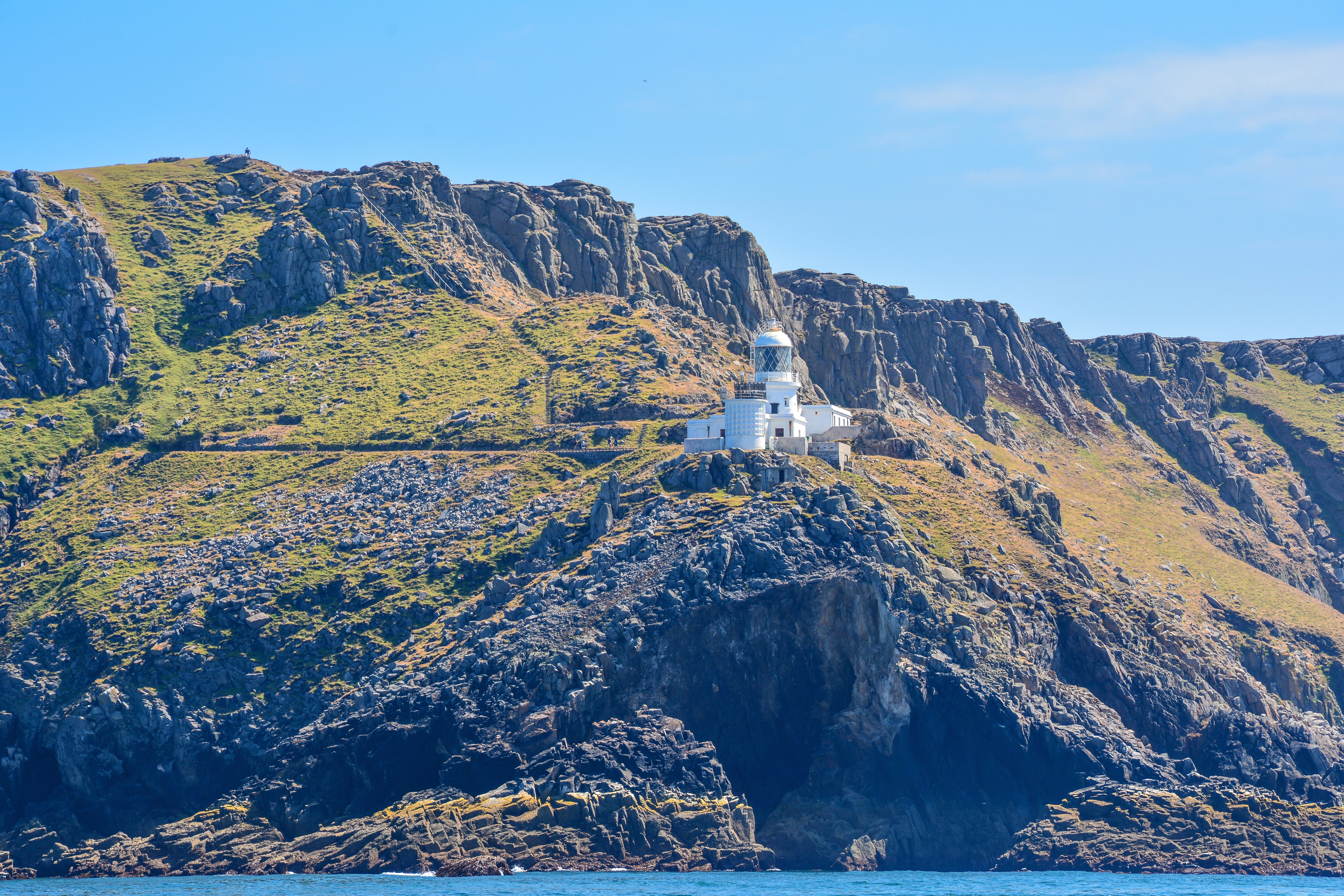
The North Lighthouse viewed from the sea.

The North lighthouse is 56 ft (17 m) tall, slightly taller than the south one, and has a focal plane of 157 ft (48 m). In designing this lighthouse, Matthews was said to have availed himself of 'every modern development of lighthouse construction and illumination'. The 3.5-ton lens assembly was the first in Britain to be supported on a mercury trough; manufactured by Barbier & Benard of Paris, it was a first-order revolving four-panel optic in a 'bi-valve' configuration (i.e. 2 sets of 2 panels arranged back-to-back), which displayed a group-flashing characteristic, flashing twice every 20 seconds. It was originally lit by a 5-wick Trinity House oil burner, but this was replaced in the early 20th century with a Matthews triple-mantle (3×50 mm or 2 in) petroleum vapour burner (PVB), which was itself replaced with a Hood single-mantle (75 mm or 3 in) PVB in the 1920s. (Oil was lifted up from a small quay using a sled and winch, and then transported using a small railway (again winch-powered), the remains of which can be still seen).

When built the North lighthouse was provided with a two-tone fog siren, housed in an engine house immediately to the north (seaward) side of the tower; it sounded four blasts (low/high/low/high) every two minutes through a pair of upright curved horns mounted on the roof, and was powered by a pair of 16-brake-horsepower (12-kilowatt) Hornsby oil engines (manufactured by Manlove, Alliott & Co. Ltd.). The petroleum oil used to power the engines was the same as that used to fuel the lamp; it was kept in large tanks at the base of the tower.

The fog signal was replaced in 1929 with a more powerful 12-inch siren, installed along with a pair of conical resonators in a cast-iron turret, which was added to the engine room roof; twin Gardner T-type diesel engines were installed at the same time to drive the air compressors. New Ruston & Hornsby diesel engines were installed in 1969 to generate electricity for a new triple-frequency electric fog signal, which sounded two blasts every thirty seconds from a curved stack of 72 Tannoy speakers built on to the front of the engine house; it was decommissioned in 1988.

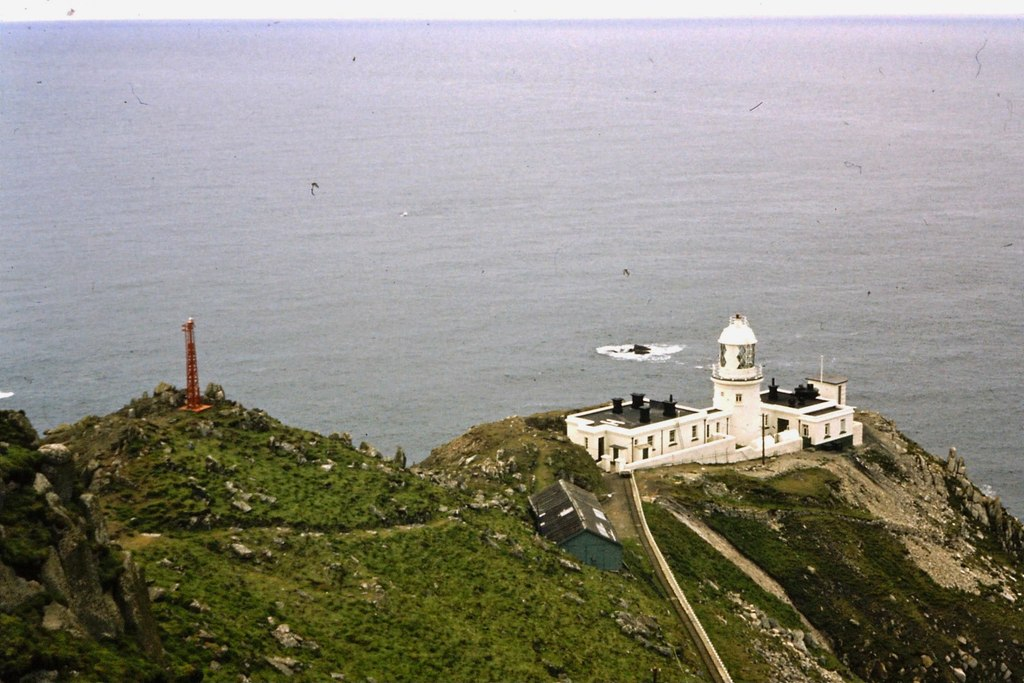
A 1974 photo of the North Lighthouse.

In 1971 the lighthouse was converted to electricity, and the old lamp and optic were decommissioned; they were replaced by a discharge bulb, fed from the generators, and a 4th-order revolving optic mounted on an AGA gearless pedestal. This new, much smaller optic (made up of four lens panels arranged in two pairs) maintained the old characteristic (flashing twice every twenty seconds) but with a slightly increased range of 19 nmi (35 km). In 1976 the keepers were withdrawn and the light was monitored from the South lighthouse until 1985, when it was fully automated. The North lighthouse was further modernised in 1991 and converted to solar power; in place of the light in the tower a small rotating lantern (an 'Orga Rml 302 SA rotating beacon with 6 position lampchanger') was mounted on top of the old fog horn building, producing a quick white flash every 15 seconds. Between 2019 and 2020 the lighthouse building underwent a major refurbishment, in the course of which the light (provided by a new LED lamp arrangement) was returned to the lantern of the tower.

=== South lighthouse ===
The South lighthouse is set in a somewhat more spacious site; the tower is 52 ft (16 m) tall. When built, equipment from the old Lundy Lighthouse was reused in this tower, including the 1857 revolving optic (which remained in use until 1962). Equipped with a Matthews five-wick petroleum burner, it initially displayed a single white flash once a minute, visible up to 19 nautical miles (35 km; 22 mi) away; in 1925 it was altered to flash once every 30 seconds. In 1962 the light was electrified: the paraffin vapour burner was replaced by a 1 kW filament lamp, powered by a pair of generators, and in place of the old lens assembly a much smaller fourth-order optic was installed, flashing once every five seconds (with a nominal range of 24 nautical miles (44 km; 28 mi)). At the same time an engine room was built on to the south-east side of the tower.

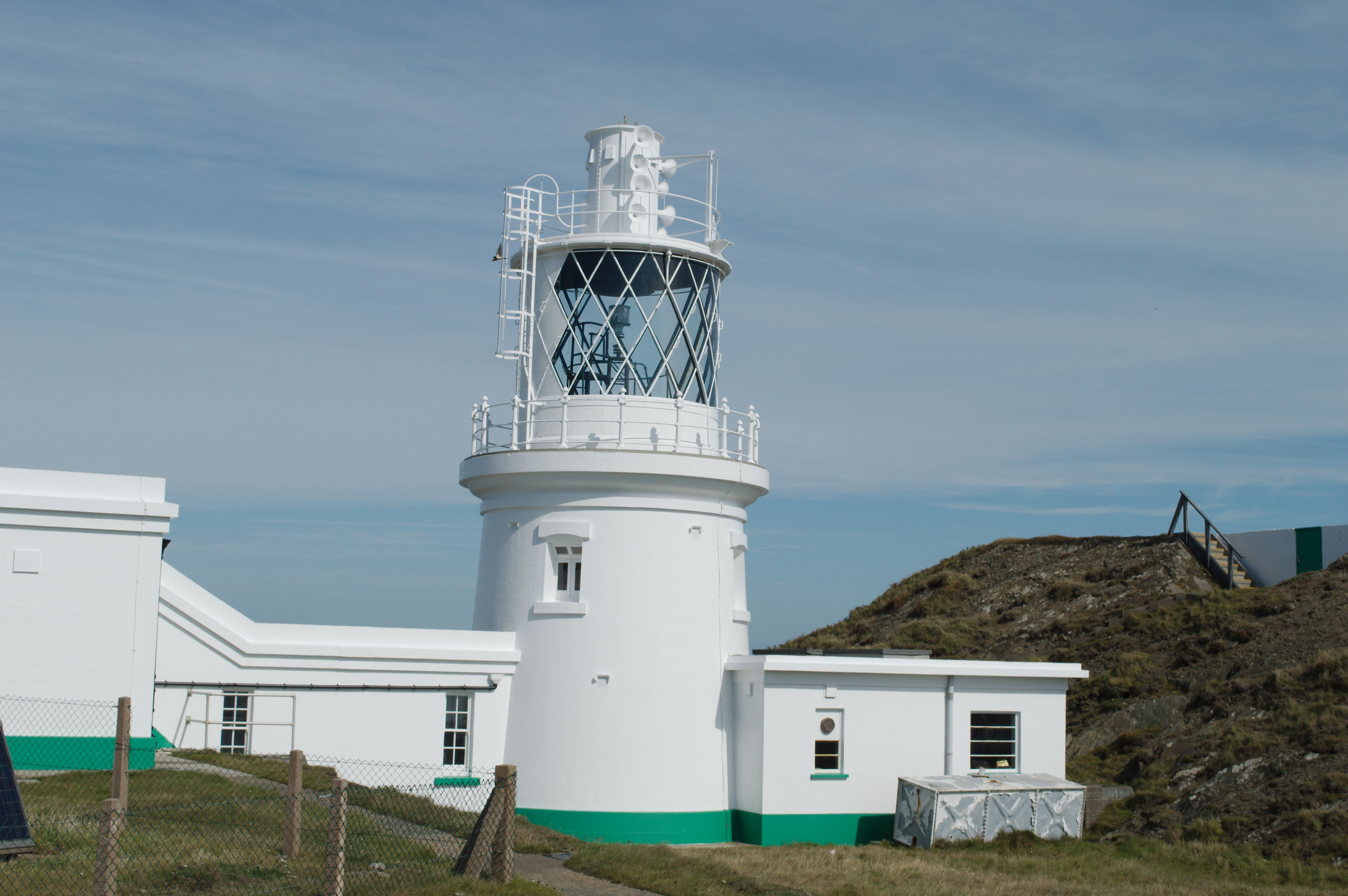
The South Lighthouse with 1990s optic inside the lantern and 1960s fog signal equipment on top of it.

In contrast to the North, the South lighthouse sounded an explosive fog signal; initially discharged manually from the lantern gallery, in 1908 a small building was constructed (where there is now a helicopter pad) containing an automated apparatus provided by the Clockwork Explosive Fog Signal Company of Victoria. It remained in use until 1964 when it was replaced by a set of 'supertyfon' air horns, eight in number, placed in a housing on top of the lantern. Thirty years later, just prior to the automation of the South light, the supertyfon was itself replaced by an electric emitter, installed alongside it.

The South lighthouse was automated and converted to solar power in 1994. The revolving optic, in use since 1962, was removed at this time; (in 2001 it was installed in Dungeness Lighthouse where it remains in use). In its place in the lantern room there is now a smaller rotating beacon manufactured by the Dutch firm Orga. It has a focal height of 174 ft (53 m) and displays a quick white flash every 5 seconds with a range of 15 nautical miles (28 km; 17 mi). It can be seen as a small white dot from Hartland Point, 11 mi (18 km) to the southeast.
