= Farne Islands =

Island group off Northumberland, England

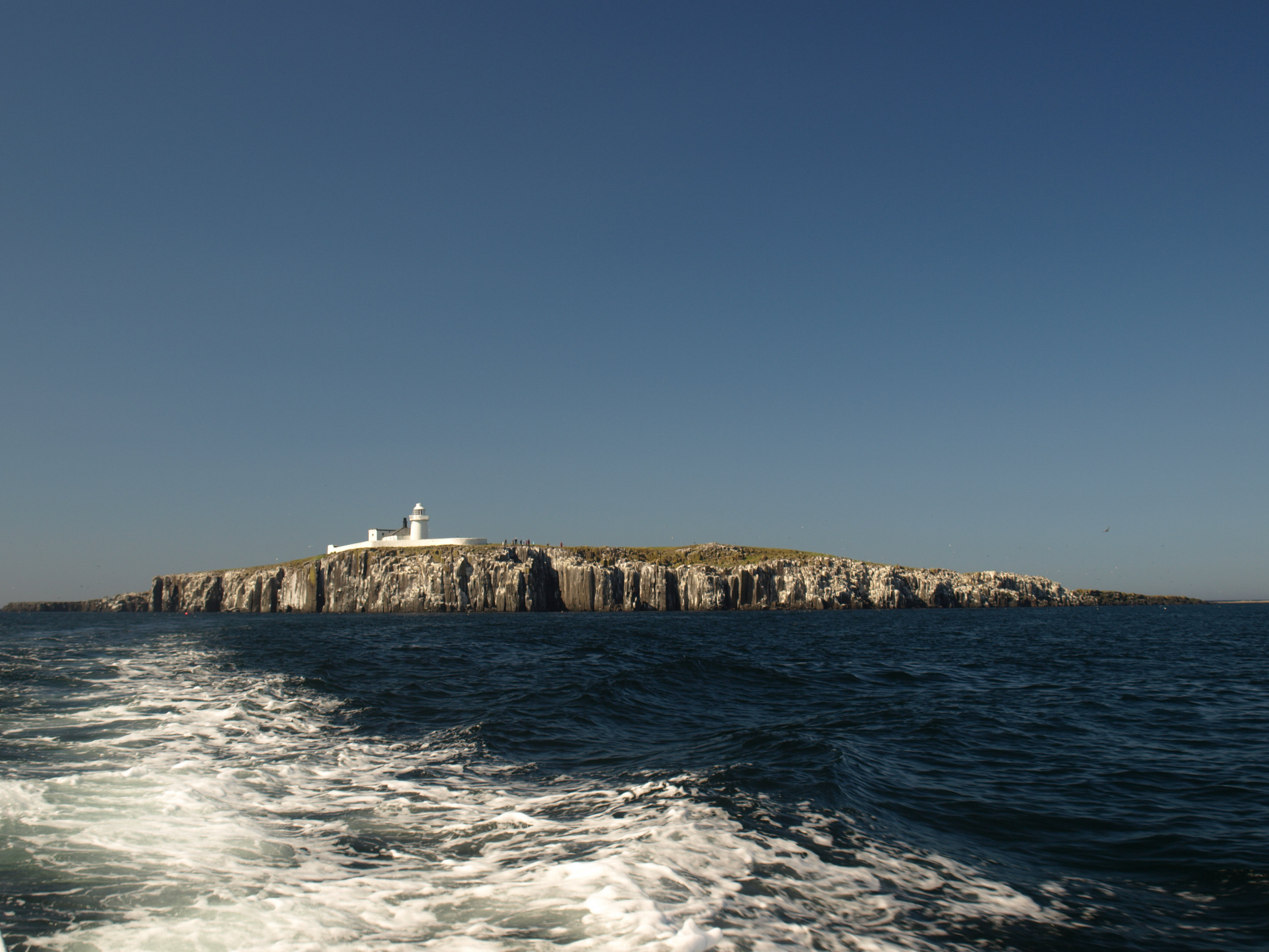
- Inner Farne and its lighthouse: White bird droppings stain the cliff.

- Location within Northumberland

Geography
- Location: North Sea
- Coordinates: 55.622°N 1.628°W
- OS grid reference: NU235365
- Total islands: 20

Administration
- United Kingdom

The Farne Islands are a group of islands in the civil parish of North Sunderland, off the coast of Northumberland, England. The group has between 15 and 20 islands depending on the level of the tide. They form an archipelago, divided into the Inner and the Outer Group. The main islands in the Inner Group are Inner Farne, Knoxes Reef, the East and West Wideopens (all joined on very low tides), and (somewhat separated) the Megstone; the main islands in the Outer Group are Staple Island, Brownsman, North and South Wamses, Big Harcar, and Longstone. The two groups are separated by Staple Sound. The highest point on Inner Farne is 19 metres (62 ft) above mean sea level and on Staple Island is 14 metres (46 ft).

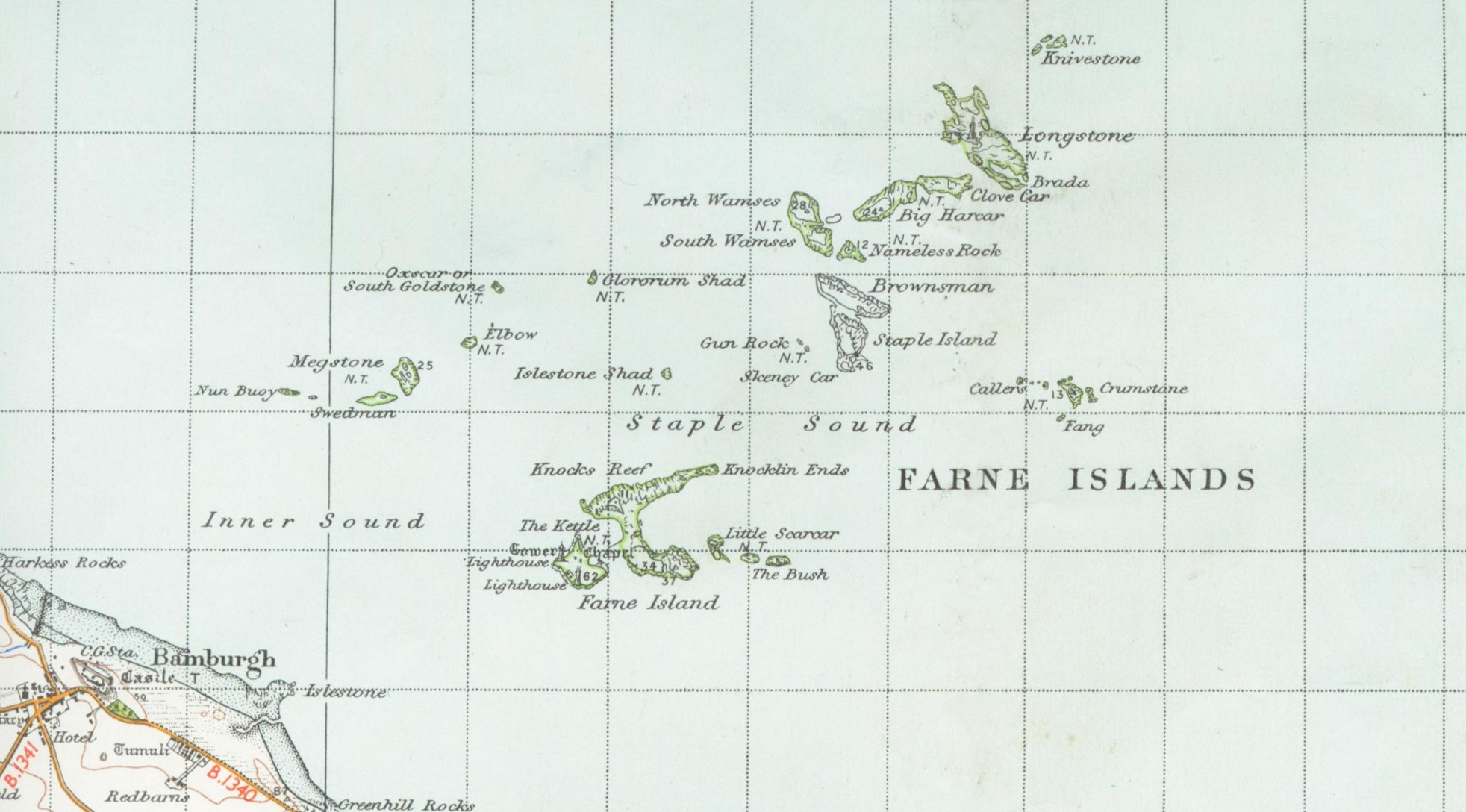
A map of Farne Islands in 1947

== History ==
=== Monks and hermits ===
The earliest recorded inhabitants of the Farne Islands were various Culdees, some connected with Lindisfarne. This followed the old Celtic Christian tradition of island hermitages, also found in Wales, Ireland, and Scotland.

The islands are first recorded in 651, when they became home to Saint Aidan, followed by Saint Cuthbert. Cuthbert isolated himself on the islands until he was called to the bishopric of Lindisfarne, but after two years, he returned to the solitude of the Inner Farne and died there in 687, when Saint Aethelwold took up residence, instead. Among other acts, Cuthbert introduced special laws in 676 protecting the eider ducks, and other seabirds nesting on the islands; these are thought to be the earliest bird-protection laws anywhere in the world.

The islands were used by hermits intermittently from the 7th century. These included Saint Bartholomew of Farne. The last hermit was Thomas De Melsonby, who died on the islands in 1246.

A formal monastic cell of Benedictine monks was established on the islands circa 1255. The cell was dependent on Durham Abbey, now Durham Cathedral. A very small cell, it was usually home to only two monks, although on occasion this rose to as many as six. The cell was dissolved in 1536 as part of King Henry VIII's Dissolution of the Monasteries.

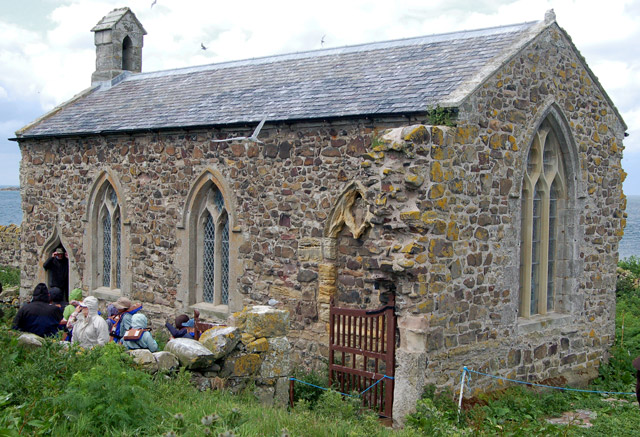
St Cuthbert's Chapel

Following the dissolution of the monastic cell on the islands, they became the property of the Dean and Chapter of Durham Cathedral, who leased them to various tenants. The islands remained a detached part of County Durham until 1844, when the Counties (Detached Parts) Act transferred them to Northumberland. In 1861, the islands were sold to Charles Thorp, who was at the time Archdeacon of Durham. In 1894, the islands were bought by industrialist William Armstrong, 1st Baron Armstrong. In 1923, a meeting of the Natural History Society of Northumberland, Durham and Newcastle upon Tyne made a public appeal for funds to enable the purchase of the Farne Islands and then to hand them over to the National Trust. The islands are currently owned by the National Trust.

Remains still exist of the 7th-century anchorite cell used by Saint Aidan and Saint Cuthbert, as do the remains of a 14th-century chapel associated with the cell. Known as St Cuthbert's Chapel, it is described as a "single-cell building of four bays". The remains of a second chapel have been incorporated into a later building.

=== Grace Darling ===
The Farne Islands are associated with the story of Grace Darling and the wreck of the Forfarshire. Grace Darling was the daughter of Longstone lighthouse-keeper (one of the islands' lighthouses) William Darling, and on 7 September 1838, when she was aged 22, with her father she rescued nine people from the wreck of the Forfarshire in a strong gale and thick fog, the vessel having run aground on Harcar Rock. The story of the rescue attracted extraordinary attention throughout Britain, and made Grace Darling a heroine who has gone down in British folklore.

=== Tourism ===
By the 18th century, picnics were being held on the Farne Islands. A picnic was held in 1778 on Pinnacle Island by Dr Kayne and his house party which consisted of ten persons and one dog. The picnic was illustrated by S. H. Grimm who made a drawing of the house party and a separate drawing of the accompanying seven servants enjoying a picnic meal.

== Today ==
The islands have no permanent population, but National Trust rangers live on the islands for nine months of the year, maintaining the site and monitoring wildlife. They live in Prior Castell's Tower on the Inner Farne (the largest and closest inshore of the islands), Lighthouse Cottage on Inner Farne and the lighthouse cottage on the Brownsman in the outer group. The pele tower was built during the early part of the 1494–1519 tenure of Thomas Castell as Prior of Durham.

=== Lighthouses ===
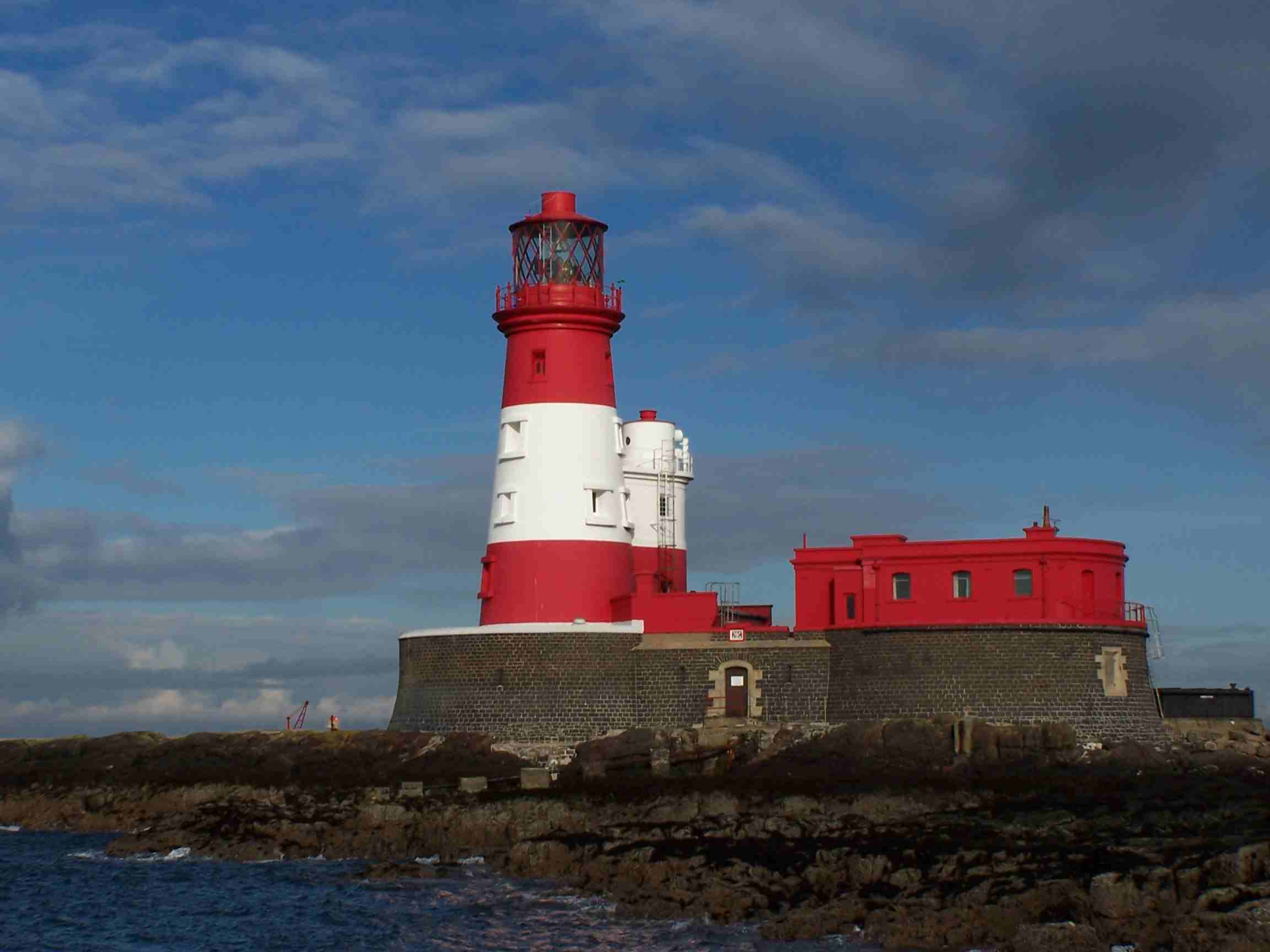
Longstone lighthouse in the Farnes from where Grace Darling and her father launched their rescue. (The lighthouse would not have been painted red and white in Grace Darling's day).

The first lighthouse was built on the islands in 1773; prior to that, a beacon may have been installed on Prior Castell's Tower, permission having first been given for a light on Inner Farne in 1669.

Currently, two lighthouses are operated by Trinity House on the Farne Islands:

- Farne Lighthouse was built in 1811 and originally named Inner Farne Lighthouse.
- Longstone Lighthouse was built in 1826 and originally named Outer Farne Lighthouse.

Former lighthouses on the islands include:

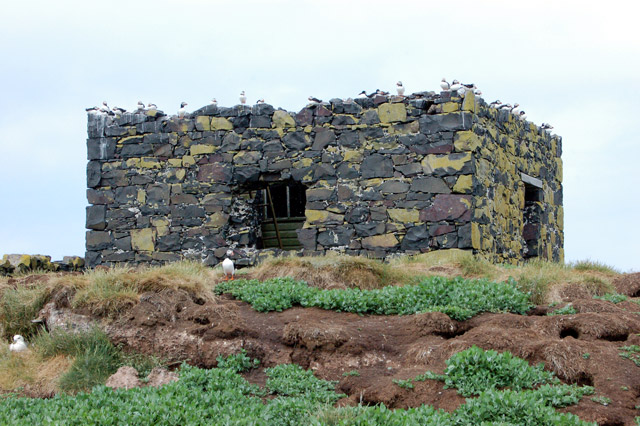
Ruined base of the lighthouse on Staple Island

- Farne Island Lighthouse was built in 1673, but never lit; its replacement was built by Captain John Blackett in 1778, itself replaced by Trinity House with the current Farne Lighthouse in 1811. A minor light, called the Low Light, was also established by Trinity House on the north-west of Farne between 1811 and 1910. to aid navigation by lining this light up with the Inner Farne light
- Staple Island Lighthouse was built by Captain Blackett in 1778 and blown down in the Great Storm of 1784; a replacement, built either in the same place or on Brownsman Island, was knocked down by heavy seas in 1800.
- Brownsman Lighthouse, built in 1800, was replaced by Trinity House with a new tower in 1811 and closed in 1826 when Longstone Lighthouse was established.

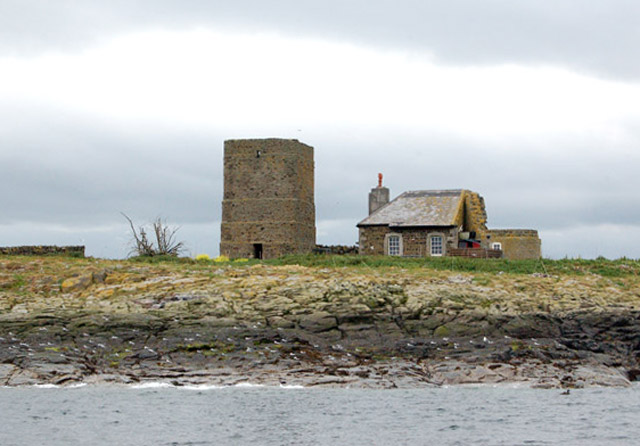
Site of the former lighthouse on Brownsman Island (1811–26): Its base remains attached to the right of the keeper's cottage. Earlier, a light was once shone from the tower on the left.

All the operational lighthouses on the Farnes are now automatic and have no resident keepers, although in former years, they did. The lighthouse is now maintained by Trinity House via its local lighthouse attendant, George Shiel, who provides guided tours inside the lighthouse. Ruins of some of the older lighthouses may be seen, for example on the Brownsman, which has two. Before the lighthouses, beacons were on several of the islands. The prominent white streak on the cliff facing the mainland (see photo) is similar to bird droppings; although many parts of the islands do exhibit this colouring during the breeding season only, in this case it is the result of chalk deposits from the many years of spent calcium carbide from the lighthouse being thrown down the cliff; this calcium carbide was used to generate acetylene, which was used as fuel for the light before electricity came.

== Ecology and natural history ==
The Farne Islands are an internationally important wildlife habitat. In summer eider duck, cormorant, shag, fulmar, kittiwake, Arctic tern, common tern, Sandwich tern, guillemot, razorbill, and puffins all breed here, while in late autumn a large colony of grey seals pup on the islands. Summer visitors to Inner Farne are strongly advised to wear hats due to Arctic terns dive bombing to protect their chicks.

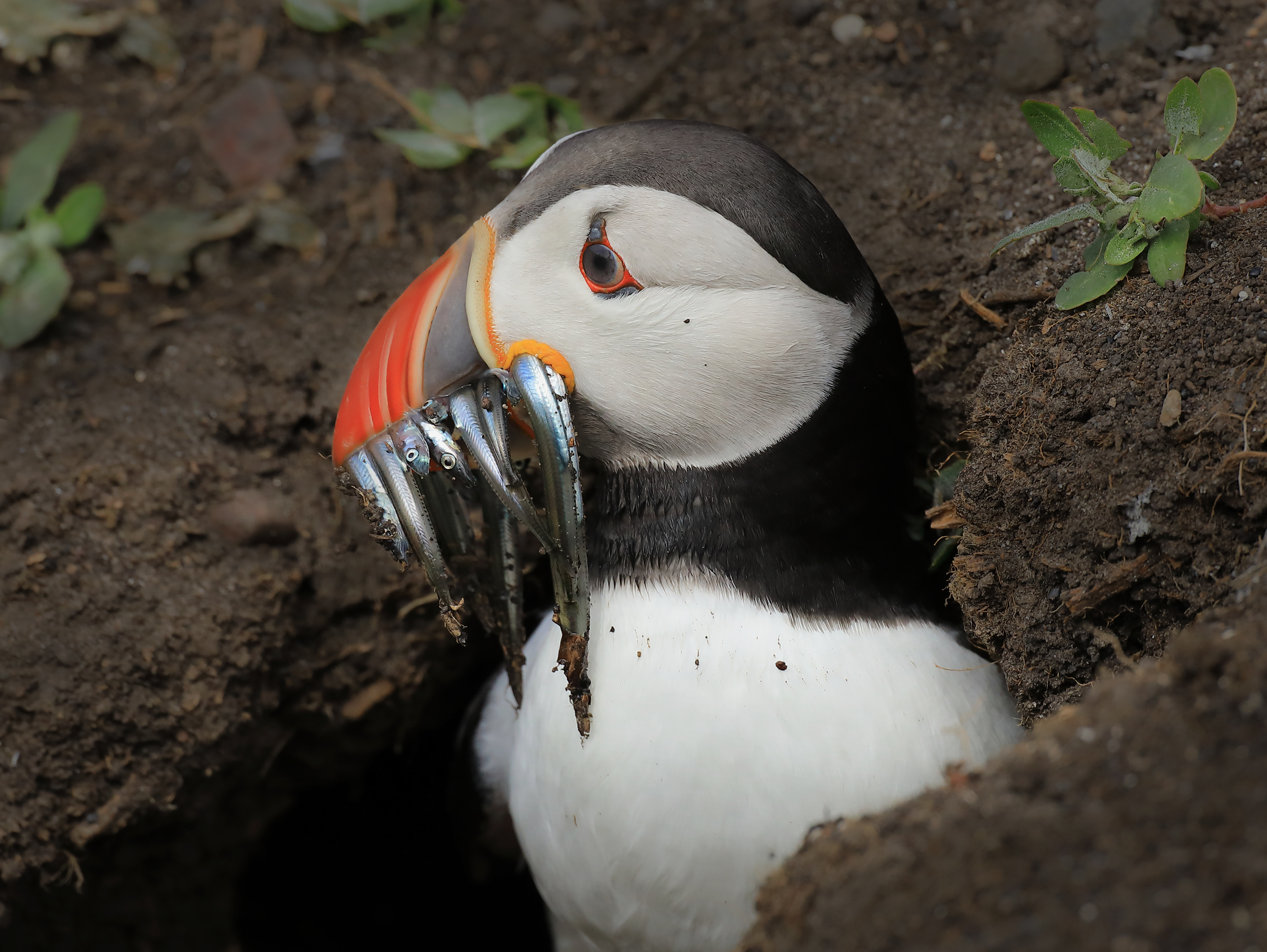
A puffin safe in its burrow on the Farne Islands

Breeding birds on the Farnes (as of 2022; 2021 counts marked *) include:

- Canada goose – 4 pairs
- Mallard – 13 pairs
- Common eider – 417 pairs
- Red-breasted merganser – 1 pair*
- Oystercatcher – 17 pairs
- Ringed plover – 4 pairs
- Kittiwake – 4,772 pairs
- Black-headed gull – 479 pairs
- Great black-backed gull – 24 pairs
- Herring gull – 1,219 pairs*
- Lesser black-backed gull – 1,088 pairs*
- Sandwich tern – 336 pairs
- Roseate tern – last bred 2015 (1 pair)
- Common tern – 51 pairs
- Arctic tern – 882 pairs
- Guillemot – 59,168 birds
- Razorbill – 523 pairs
- Puffin – 36,211 pairs*
- Fulmar – 271 pairs*
- Cormorant – 98 pairs
- Shag – 437 pairs
- Carrion crow – 1 pair
- Barn swallow – 7 pairs
- Pied wagtail – 4 pairs
- Rock pipit – 11 pairs

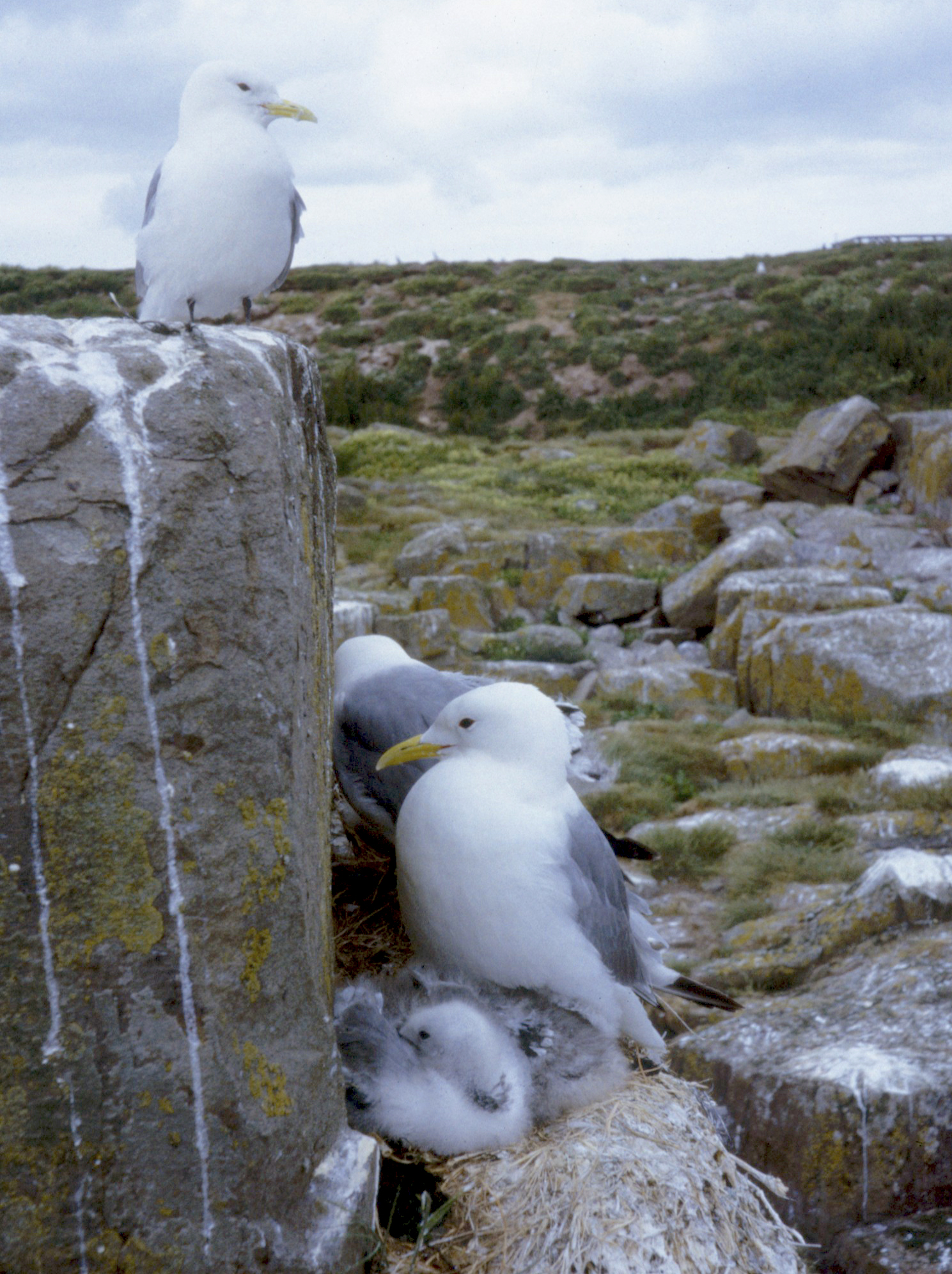
Black-legged kittiwake (Rissa tridactyla) at nest on Staple Island

A total of 303 bird species have been recorded on the Farnes, including in the 1760s, an example of the now extinct great auk.

On 28–29 May 1979, an Aleutian tern, a rare tern from the Aleutian Islands in the North Pacific Ocean, visited the Farnes. It was the first, and still the only, member of its species ever seen anywhere in Europe.

A longer-staying unusual visitor was "Elsie" the lesser crested tern, which visited the Farnes every summer from 1984 to 1997; during that period (paired with a male Sandwich tern) she raised several hybrid chicks and attracted several thousand birders keen to see this species in Britain. Lesser crested terns normally nest on islands off the coast of Libya and migrate to West Africa for the winter; "Elsie" is thought to have taken a wrong turn at the Straits of Gibraltar on spring migration.

An Arctic tern from the Farnes, ringed as a chick not yet old enough to fly in summer 1982, reached Melbourne, Australia, in October 1982, a sea journey over 22,000 kilometres (14,000 mi) in just three months from fledging. This remains one of the longest known distances travelled by any bird.

== Geology ==
The Farnes are resistant igneous dolerite outcrops. These would originally have been connected to the mainland and surrounded by areas of less resistant limestone. Through a combination of erosion of the weaker surrounding rock, and sea level rise following the last ice age, the Farnes were left as islands. Because of the way the rock is fissured, dolerite forms strong columns. This gives the islands their steep, in places vertical cliffs, and the sea around the islands is scattered with stacks up to 19 metres (62 ft) high on Inner Farne and 14 metres (46 ft) on Staple Island. Many of the small islands are bare rock, but the larger islands have a layer of clay subsoil and peat soil supporting vegetation. The rock strata slope slightly upwards to the south, giving the highest cliffs on the south and some beaches to the north.

One popular view of the Farnes, is from the harbour at Seahouses. The islands are closer to the mainland farther north, towards Bamburgh, where they can be viewed from the Monks House Rocks, as well as from Bamburgh Castle and beach.

== Shipwrecks and diving ==
The Farne Islands are popular with bird watchers, and as scuba diving locations, with a variety of sites suitable for all levels of divers, for the seals and wrecks.

Hundreds of ships have been wrecked on the Farnes over the years, providing plenty for wreck divers to explore. Among them are:

Name	Year
Abessinia	1921
Acantha	1915
Adelina	1862
Advance	1891
Aepos	1920
African Prince	1931
Aid	1853
Alert	1918
Alexander	1845
Alexander	1947
Arab	1849
Arbutus	1890
Ardincaple	1833
Armed Dutch vessel	1650–1715
Arms	1825
Ascot (HMS)	1918
Assuan	1943
Athelduke	1945
Attwood	1876
Auckland Castle	1918
Augusta	1823
Autumn	1834
Baltanglia	1940
Bonaventure	1559
Bowling	1939
Brave of Inverness	1850
Breeze	1852
Britannia	1795
Britannia III	1875
Britannia IIII	1915
Britannia PSS	1849
Byron	1851
Cairnduna	1875
Calcium	1876
Caledonia	1917
Caledonia of Montrose	1802
Caroline	1955
Cherokee	(1818)
Cheviot	1853
Children's Friend	1993
Chris Christensen	1915
Christa	1976
City of Aberdeen	(1816)
Constance	1972
Coryton	1941
Countess of Mar	1847
Courier	1875
Cresswell	1869
Cydonia	1916
Danio	2013 (refloat)
Doore	1855
Dublin	1805
Dunelm	1949 (refloat)
Earne	1859
Eclipse	1851
Elizabeth Fawcett	(1846)
Elliott	1852
Emerald	1865
Emily Reaich	1924
Emma	1914
Empire Ford	1943 (refloat)
Enterprise	1876
Est	1871
Euphemia	1848
Everene	(1940)
Excel	1939 (refloat)
Expedit	1917
Faith	(1847)
Falcon	1851
Fame	1833
Fifeshire	1852
Flora	(1882)
Florence Dombey	1933
Florence Nightingale	1860
Flower of Ross	1890
Forfarshire	1838
Formica	1894
Fædreland	
French caravels (two)	1462
Friends	(1857)
Friendship	1795
G.R. Grey	1918
Garent	1842
Gebruder	1916
Generous Mind	(1809)
Geir	1908
George & Mary	1823
Glasgow packet	1806
Glen	(1909)
Glenorm	(1906)
Glenorca	1913 (refloat)
Good Cheer	2000
Gowan	1917
Graciana	1920 (refloat)
Grade	1955 (refloat)
Grosvenor	1935
Gudveig	1940
Gustav Vigeland	1916
Gwendoline	1893
Harmony	1857
Hazard	1815
Helen	1853
Helmsdale	1939
Hero	1817
Hetos	1940
Hibernia	1876
Holmrook	1892
Holy Island Coble	1895
Holy Island yawl	1875
Hope (Smack)	1819
Horley	1922
Humber Packet	1812
Igor	1918
Ilala	1876
Inatje Baaf	1894
Industry	1774
Isbul & Margarit	1849
Isabella Fowlie	1941
Isorna	1941
Ivanhoe	1857
Jægersborg	1916
Jack Tar	1854
James B Graham	1922
James Harris	1881
Jan Ryswyck	1924
Jane and Margaret	1867
Janet Johnson	1853
Jean and Jessie	1856
Jemima	1851
Jeremiah	1806
Jessie	1847
Joan	1845
Johns	(1841)
Johns	(1845)
John	1849
John & Isabella	1808
John G. Watson	1930
Juno	1819
Kestrel	1917
Kincardine	1818
Kopanes	1941
Lady Duff	(1853) (refloat)
Lady of the Lake	1866
Lady Panmure	1851
Lady Ross	1847
Lancaster	1854
Leda	1886
Liberty	1849
Liddle	1774
Lilly Miles	1899
Loch Leven	1902
Lord Strathmore	1917 (refloat)
Lucerne	1915 (refloat)
Luiste Josephine	1851
Lunesdale	1929
Maggie Lauder	1804
Maid of Aln	1863
Manchant	1852
Manly	1852
Martha	1827
May	1894
Maystone	1949
Medora	1865
Mermaid	1823
Merwede	1918
Mistley	1951
Monkwearmouth	1823
Mormilion Frederick	1800
Myrtle (brig)	1864
Nellie	1849
Neptune	(1819)
Nisus	1853
Ocean Bridge	1873
Orca	1982
Otago	1915
Otto M'Combie	1895
Paciline Defecamp	1850
Pallas	1901
Paragon	1821
Paragon	1842
Paragon	1895
Patia	1941
Peace and Plenty	1860
Pearle	1740
Peggy	1774
Plough	1850
Pluto	1940
Prosperous	1854
Queenstown	1916
Rececca	1899
Resolute	1886
River Leven	1953
Ryoll of Stockton	1801
Saint Evelyn Joyce	1922
Saint Louis	1924 (refloat)
San Bernado	1916
Sarah	1815
Scottish Prince	1913
Sedulous 2	1975
Shadwan	1888
Sisters	1832
Skovdal	1917
Sloop no. 28	(1806)
Snowdonia	1881
Somali	1941
Sootica	1985
Smilax	(1851)
Sphynx	1919
Spica	1916
St Abbs Head	1949
St Andre	1908
St Fergus	1885
St. Salvator	1472
Stamfordham	1916
Storfors	1940
Strive	1856
Success	1774
Success	1853
Thistle	1883
Thomas	1837
Thomas Jackson	1825
Tioga	1943
Tredegar Hall	1916 (refloat)
Trio	1860
Two Brothers	1841
U-1274	1945
Urdate	1823
Vaagan	1916
Valhal	1890
Volunteer	1846 (refloat)
Waren Packet	1830
Werner Kunstmann	1914
William Thorpe	1852
William (schooner)	1864
Yagen	1916
Yewglen	1960

=== Dive sites and wrecks ===
- Chris Christenson, a Danish steamer that sank on 16 February 1915, lies close into the reef off the south tip of Longstone, Outer Farnes, in about 30–35 metres (98–115 ft) at (55°38.397′N 1°36.182′W).
- Abessinia, a 138-metre (453 ft) German steamship that drove onto Knivestone, Outer Farnes, on 3 September 1921, lies in about 10–20 metres (30–66 ft) at (55°38.9′N 1°36.12′W).
- Brittania, a 750-tonne (740-long-ton), 64-metre (210 ft) British cargo/passenger steamship that struck the Callers, Outer Farnes, in thick fog on 25 September 1915 lies between 10–30 metres (26–98 ft) at (55°37.688′N 1°35.991′W).
- St Andre was a 1,140-tonne (1,120-long-ton) French steamship carrying pig iron. On 28 October 1908, she hit the Crumstone and floated off to sink finally at Staple Island. She lies in about 17–25 metres (56–82 ft) at (55°37.84′N 1°37.18′W).

Diving at the Farnes is generally possible, regardless of wind direction; shelter is always available somewhere. Some dive locations even provide the opportunity to combine diving and birdwatching, in particular the Pinnacles, where guillemots can be found fishing at safety-stop depth.

== Civil parish ==
Farne Islands was a civil parish, in 1951 the parish had a population of 3. On 1 April 1955 the parish was abolished and merged with North Sunderland.

== Sources ==
- White, John Talbot (1973). The Scottish Border and Northumberland. London: Eyre Metheun. ISBN 0 413 30270 9.
