= Bartholomew of Farne =

English Roman Catholic saint

Saint Bartholomew of Farne
- Born: c. 1120; Whitby, England
- Died: 1193; Farne Islands, England
- Venerated in: Roman Catholic Church
- Feast: 24 June

Bartholomew of Farne (died 1193) was a Benedictine hermit. Having spent some time as a monk at Durham, he later re-located to the Farne Islands to live as a hermit.

His vita was written by one Geoffrey, a monk of Durham.

== Life ==
Born Tostig, to parents of Scandinavian origin, in Whitby, England. Being teased by his friends, he changed his name to William while still a child. He then traveled through Europe, possibly to escape marriage. While in Norway, he was ordained a priest.

He returned to England to enter the Benedictine monastery at Durham. It was here that he received a vision of Saint Cuthbert, and then decided to inhabit Cuthbert's old cell on one of the Farne Islands. There he remained for the remaining 42 years of his life.
