= Daniel Robert Alexander =

American settler & trader (1859–??)

- Born: 1859; Lincoln County, Missouri, US
- Known for: Missionary work and business activities in Ethiopia

Daniel Robert Alexander (1859 – fl. 1939) was an American settler and trader in Ethiopia. He left the US in the 1900s and arrived in Ethiopia via the United Kingdom. Alexander found work as a blacksmith and was able to use the proceeds to start a money-lending business. He became wealthy, holding a sizeable herd of cattle and managing a household of servants. Alexander sought to encourage other Americans to emigrate to Ethiopia, against the advice of the US government. He was the only US citizen resident in Addis Ababa in 1930 but some 150 of his countrymen were living in Ethiopia just a few years later. Alexander left the country in 1936 after the Italian invasion and returned to the US.

== Early life ==
Born in Lincoln County, Missouri in 1859, Alexander lived for a time in Chicago. During the early 1900s he accompanied a shipload of Missouri mules he shipped to Liverpool, UK and in 1908 travelled to Addis Ababa, Abyssinia perhaps in search of the "promised land" of Ethiopia. Alexander is reputed to have been married at this time and to have a difficult relationship with his wife. Later in life Alexander would say that he emigrated as he "wanted to see a Negro king" and because he "growed [sic] up like a wild animal that always wanted to go places". His intention was to settle in the country permanently.

== In Ethiopia ==
Arriving as a missionary Alexander married a local woman and became the first prominent Afro-American settler in the country. Alexander generated revenue by working as a blacksmith before using the proceeds to establish a money-lending business. He acquired a stretch of land near to Dembidolo after one of his customers defaulted on a loan and he lived there for a while, where he met noted missionary, doctor and writer Thomas Lambie. Alexander followed Lambie first to Gore and thence to Addis Ababa.

Alexander established a farm near to Addis Ababa, as well as diversifying into other trade, and was described as a favourite of Emperor Menelik II. He became a wealthy man and had a large herd of cattle and a household of servants. Alexander donated some property to the mission of the United Presbyterian Church of North America in Addis Ababa including a house for their missionaries. He had given up his own missionary work by 1933.

Alexander did much to encourage the emigration of both black and white Americans to Abyssinia and engaged in correspondence with supporters of such in America, though by 1930 he remained the only African-American living in Addis Ababa. This was perhaps due in part to official US opposition to the emigration of African Americans to East Africa, though by later in the 1930s there were some 150 Americans in Ethiopia, around 100 of whom were black. During his latter years in Ethiopia he was linked with Emperor Haile Selassie and was referred to as his blacksmith.

Alexander returned to the United States following the Second Italo-Ethiopian War and subsequent Italian occupation of 1936. By December 1939 he was looking for somewhere to "settle down" in Pennsylvania. Alexander is considered the first successful Black American entrepreneur in Ethiopia and was described as Ethiopia's senior Afro-American resident.
