= Thomas Lambie =

American medical missionary to Ethiopia (1885–1954)

Dr. Thomas Alexander Lambie (1885 – 14 April 1954) was a missionary medical doctor noteworthy for becoming an Ethiopian citizen, being responsible for several early medical efforts in Ethiopia (including the founding of two hospitals). He also worked as a medical doctor in Sudan, Nigeria and Palestine, where he died.

== Life ==
Dr. Lambie was born in Pittsburgh, Pennsylvania, United States. He worked as a missionary with his family in Sudan among the Nuer and Anuak people, and then sailed up the Baro River into Ethiopia in 1918, becoming the first American missionaries in Ethiopia. He began work in Sayo, Welega, and Gore in Illubabor Province.

Dr. Lambie removed a small beetle that had crawled into Governor Ras Tessema Nadew's ear that was causing great pain. Ras Nadew's gratitude led him to write a letter of commendation and an introduction to the prince regent, Ras Tafari (later Emperor Haile Selassie).

When the Lambie family traveled to Addis Ababa, Ras Tafari requested that Dr. Lambie build a hospital there, offering him a tract 12 acres in size at Gullele outside the city. Upon his return to the United States, Dr. Lambie approached his board for help with this endeavor. Although they recognized the need for a hospital the board was unable to provide him with the necessary funds, which led Lambie to embark on a fund-raising tour of his country. It was while visiting a small town in Ohio that he encountered W.S. George, a successful businessman who provided him with US$ 70,000 to found the hospital. Construction on the hospital began in 1922, which became the biggest building in Ethiopia at the time.

In 1928, having initially launched the Abyssinian Frontiers Mission in 1927, then merged it with SIM (at that time "Sudan Interior Mission") in Ethiopia, Dr. Lambie negotiated permission to begin mission work south of Addis Ababa, as far as Sidamo. This was a delicate procedure because Ras Tafari was subject to strong pressures from some in the Ethiopian Orthodox Church.

In 1932, Dr. Lambie built a leprosy hospital on the edge of Addis Ababa, now part of ALERT. At the urging of Ras Kassa, Dr. Lambie investigated building a hospital in Lalibela in 1934, but the outbreak of the war prevented this. Emperor Haile Selassie I appointed Dr. Lambie secretary-general of the new Ethiopian Red Cross to oversee the efforts of Ethiopian and foreign medical teams.

After Italy occupied Addis Ababa in 1935, Lambie at first submitted to the Italian regime in order to continue his work, going as far as to retract his reports about Italian use of mustard gas in the Second Italo-Abyssinian War. Upon the restoration of Emperor Haile Selassie to the throne, Dr. Lambie left Ethiopia; because he had acquired Ethiopian citizenship in order to own the property his hospital was built on, he was forced to apply for naturalization.

In 1946, he joined the Independent Board for Presbyterian Foreign Missions (IBPFM). He went on to work in Nigeria, Sudan, and in Palestine where he built the 90 bed Berachah Tuberculosis Sanitarium between Bethlehem and Hebron and started Baraka Bible Presbyterian Church, Bethlehem in 1953.

He died at Christ's tomb (The Garden Tomb), on April 14, 1954.

== Writings ==
- Lambie, Thomas. 1935. Abayte! or Ethiopia's Plea for Help.
- Lambie, Thomas. 1939. Doctor Without a Country (later reprinted as A Doctor’s Great Commission). New York.
- Lambie, Thomas. 1942. A Doctor Carries On. New York.
- Lambie, Thomas. 1943. Boot and Saddle in Africa. New York.
- Lambie, Thomas. 1954. A Doctor's Great Commission. Wheaton, Illinois.

== Relevant literature ==
- Anderson, William B. 1998. Thomas Lambie: Missionary Pioneer in Sudan and Ethiopia, 1907–1942. In Gateway to the Heart of Africa, edited by Francesco Pierli, Maria Teresa Ratti, and Andrew C. Wheeler, 126–145. Nairobi: Paulines Publications
- Balisky, E. Paul. 2020. Thomas A Lambie: Missionary Doctor and Entrepreneur. Wipf and Stock: Eugene, OR; 312 pp.: ISBN 9781725257641
- Unseth, Peter. 2007. "Lambie, Thomas Alexander". Encyclopaedia Aethiopica Sigbert Uhlig, ed., vol. 3:491.
