= Dan Alexander =

Dan Alexander may refer to:

- Dan Alexander (offensive lineman) (born 1955), American football offensive lineman
- Dan Alexander (fullback) (born 1978), American football fullback
