= Eugene Kellersberger =

American physician

Eugene Roland Kellersberger (August 6, 1888 – January 28, 1966) was an American physician who was a pioneer in the treatment of leprosy and a missionary surgeon in Africa. In addition to his medical research, he fought to reduce the stigma of leprosy.

== Biography ==
Kellersberger was born in Cypress Mill, Blanco County, Texas to Julius Rudolph Kellersberger and Helene Matern. He was educated at Whitis Academy in Austin, Texas, and received his B.A. from the University of Texas at Austin in 1911, followed by his M.D. in 1915 from Washington University School of Medicine. For his work in the Belgian Congo, he was awarded the Chevalier Royal Order of the Lion in 1936, the Chevalier Royal Order of the Crown in 1940, and Officer of the Royal Order of the Crown in 1957.

== Archival collections ==
The Presbyterian Historical Society in Philadelphia has the collection of Eugene R. Kellersberger's papers, including diaries, scrapbooks and biography, correspondence, medical work, personal papers, and photographic and related textual materials.
