= Daniel Asher Alexander =

English architect and engineer (1768–1846)

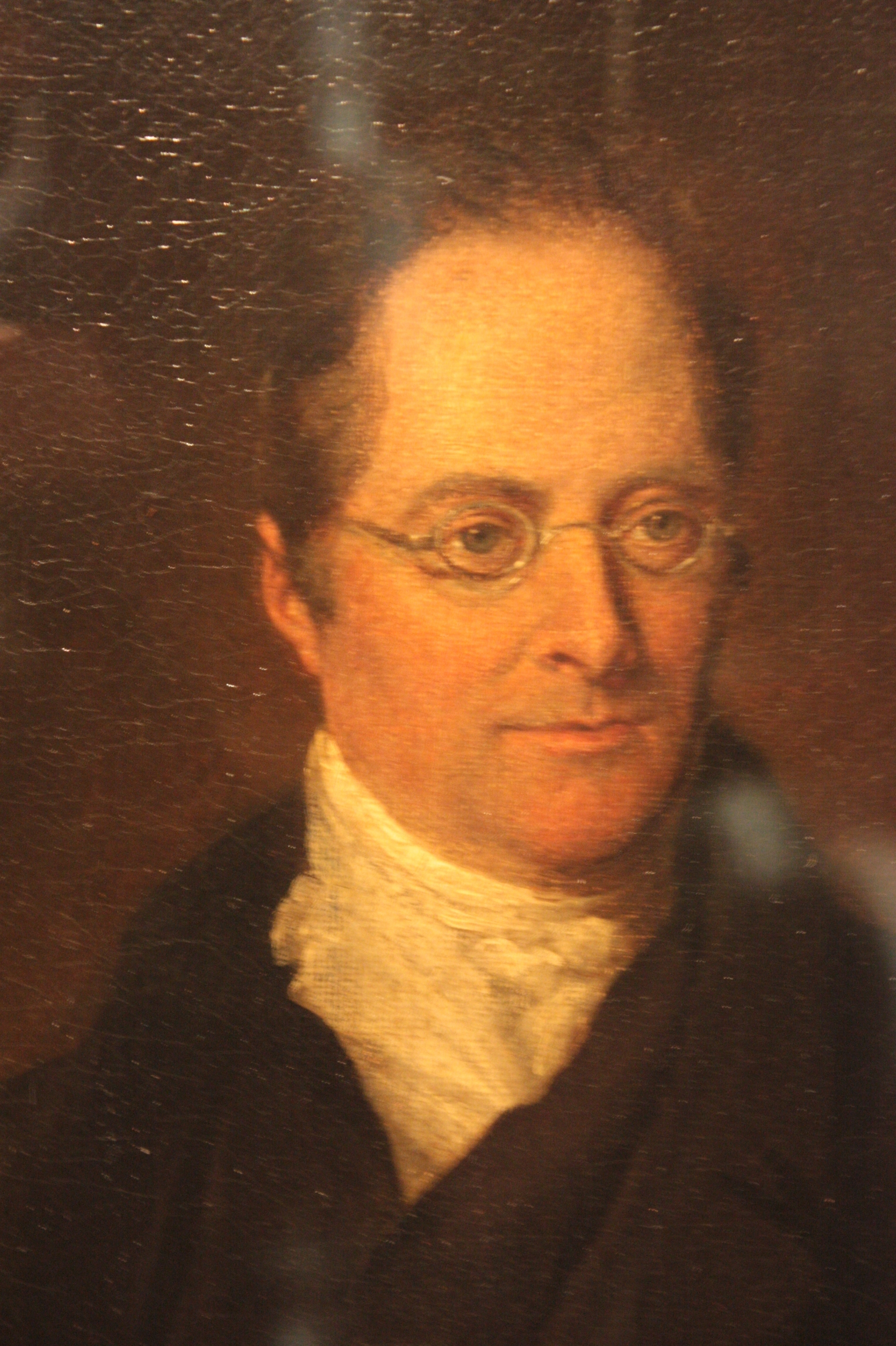
Daniel Asher Alexander

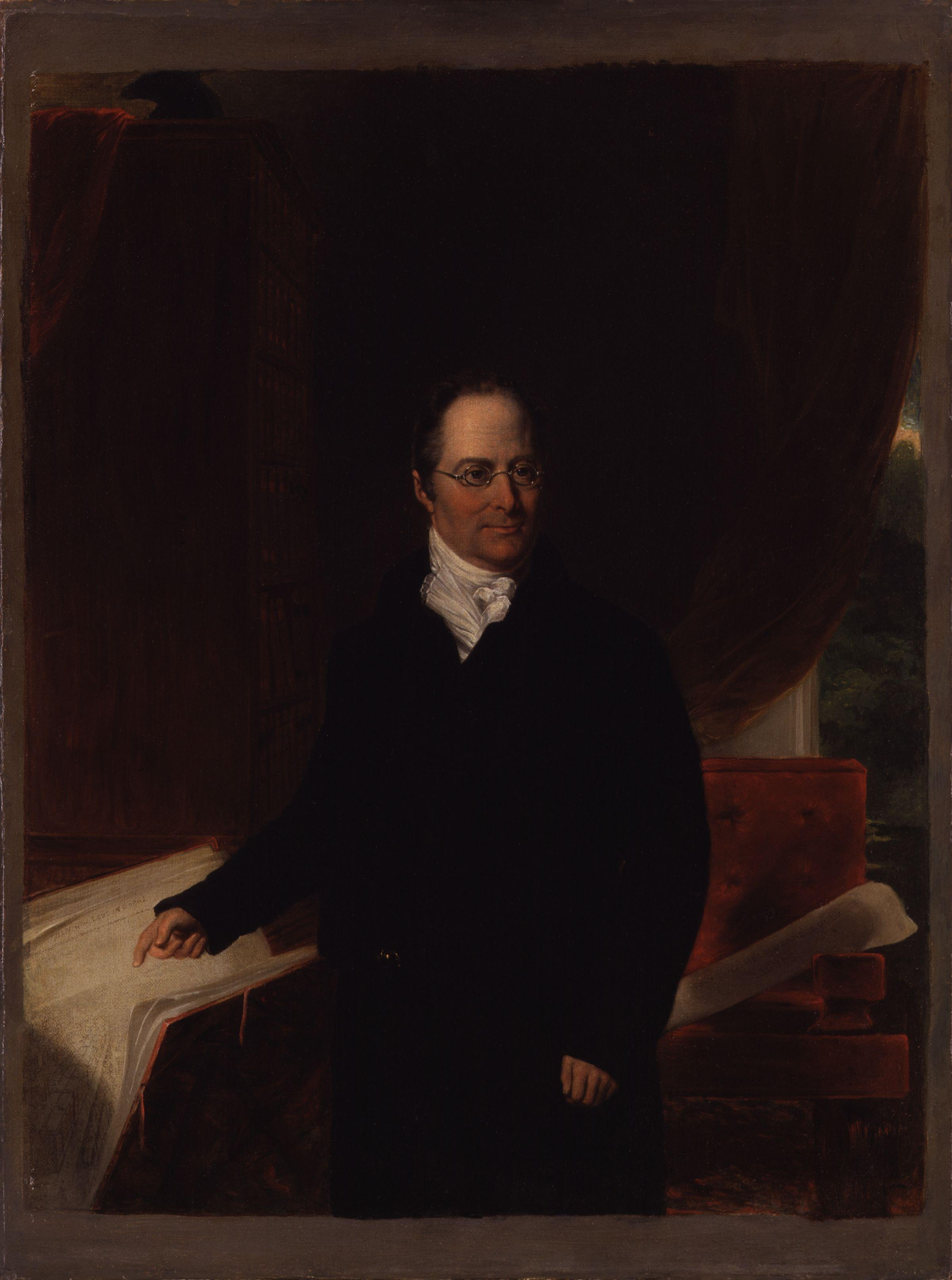
Portrait of Daniel Asher Alexander by John Partridge, circa 1818

Daniel Asher Alexander (6 May 1768 – 2 March 1846) was an English architect and engineer.

== Life ==
Daniel Asher Alexander was born in Southwark, London and educated at St Paul's School, London. He was admitted to the Royal Academy Schools in 1782.

His first major work was the improvement of the medieval bridge at Rochester. The bridge was widened and the two central arches merged into one to provide a wider channel for shipping. The work was not completed until 1824, by which time Alexander had been dismissed from his post as engineer to the bridge. He was the principal architect of Dartmoor Prison and Maidstone Prison, two of the oldest jails still in use in the United Kingdom.

Point Alexander was named after him by Captain George Vancouver in 1793.

In 1799 he carried out a detailed survey of Rochester Cathedral, and recommended a programme of repairs, which was begun in 1801.

Alexander was the surveyor to the London Dock Company between 1796 and 1831 and was responsible all the buildings at the London Docks during that time, including the Pennington Street Warehouses and the London Dock House. The dock basins themselves were by the company's engineers, including John Rennie.

In his capacity as surveyor to the Trinity House he built a number of lighthouses, including the High Lighthouse at Harwich (1818), and others at Holyhead, Farne Island, and Lundy Island, the latter built on older foundations in 1819.

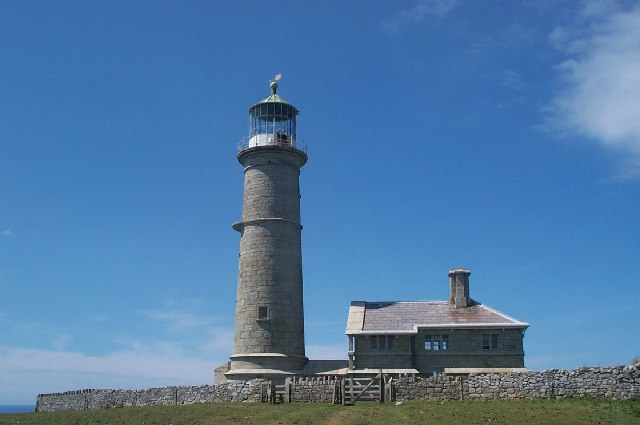
Lundy Old Lighthouse - geograph.org.uk - 15437

Other works include Mote House near Maidstone, built in the 1790s for the 1st Earl of Romney; Coley House near Reading and extensions to Inigo Jones' Queen's House (then the Royal Naval Asylum) in Greenwich, London.

In later life he lived at Yarmouth, Isle of Wight, and at Exeter, where he died.

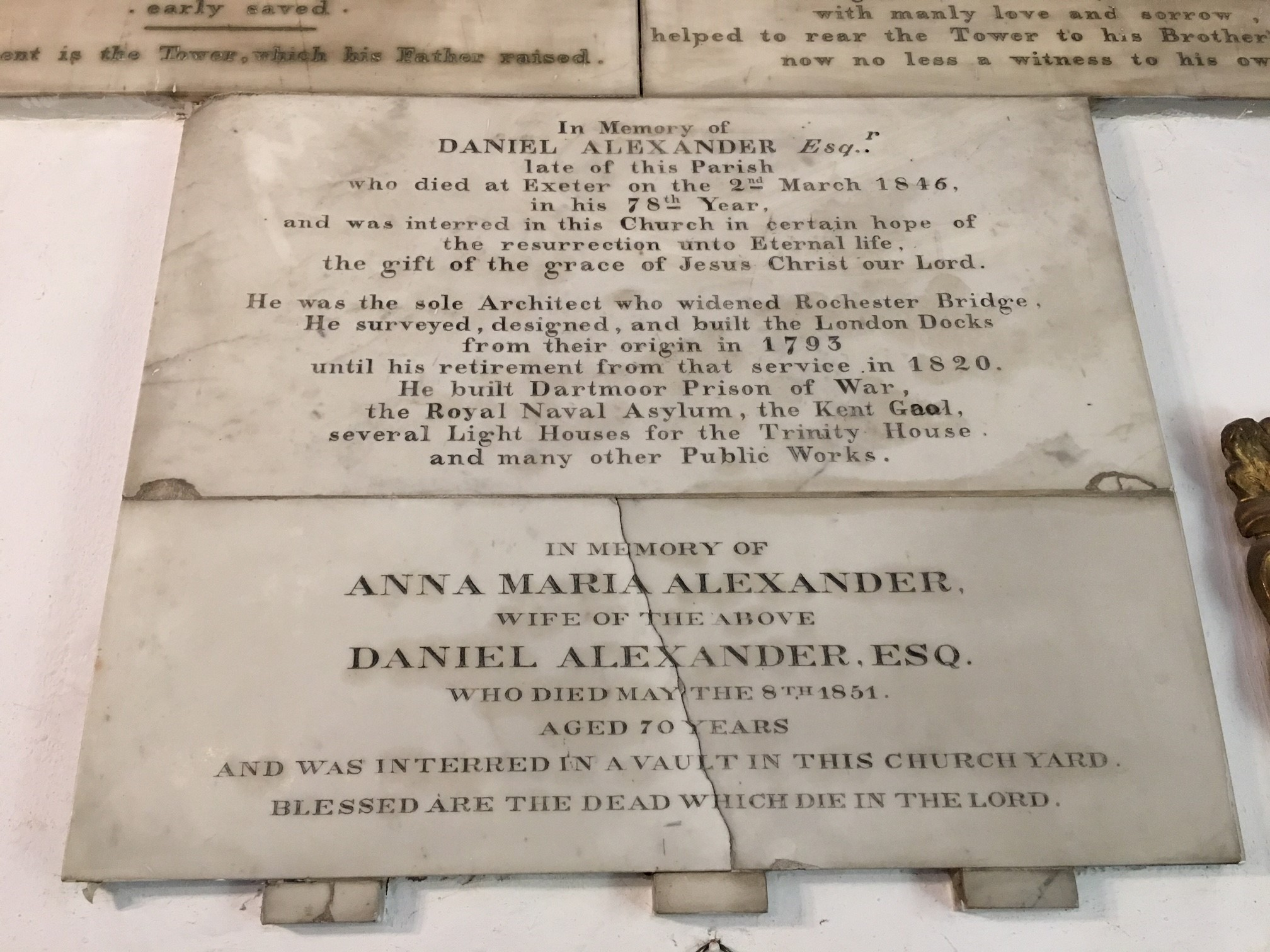
Daniel Alexander memorial in St James' Church, Yarmouth, Isle of Wight

His pupils included James Savage, John Whichcord Snr, William Hurst Ashpitel and Charles Busby.
