= Haweis =

Haweis is a surname. Notable people with the surname include:

- Hugh Reginald Haweis (1838–1901), English cleric and writer
- Mary Eliza Haweis (1848–1898), English author and painter, wife of Hugh
- Thomas Haweis (c. 1734–1820), English cleric
