= Abigail Becker =

Canadian farmer and trapper (1830s–1905)

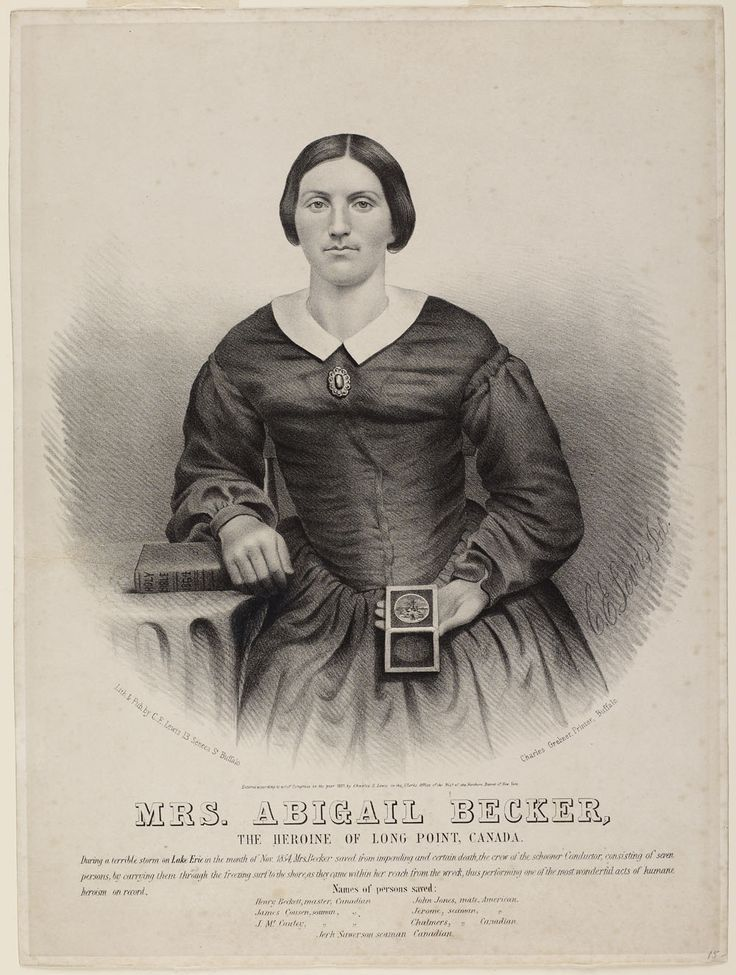
- Becker depicted c. 1856
- Born: Abigail Jackson; March 14, 1830, or March 14, 1831; Portland Township, Frontenac County, Upper Canada
- Died: March 21, 1905 (aged 75); Walsingham Township, Norfolk County, Ontario
- Burial place: Simcoe, Ontario
- Other name: The Angel of Long Point
- Occupations: Farmer; trapper
- Known for: Rescuing seventeen people over five different events
- Spouses: Jeremiah Becker (m. 1848; died 1864); Henry Rohrer (before 1870)
- Children: 19 (11 biological, 6 step-children, 2 adopted)

Abigail Becker (née Jackson; March 14, 1830, or 1831 – March 21, 1905), known as the Angel of Long Point, was a Canadian farmer and trapper who saved the lives of seventeen people across five unique incidents. These included rescuing two individuals who had fallen down separate wells when Becker was a child, and later as an adult, sailors caught in storms along the shores of Long Point on Lake Erie during three different shipwrecks. She ran a farmstead in Ontario and raised nineteen children: eleven biological children, six step-children, and two that were adopted.

Becker was recognized for acts of bravery and risking her life multiple times in hazardous conditions. She received national and international honors, including awards from the Government of Canada, Queen Victoria, and King Edward VII. Becker remains widely known as the Angel of Long Point.

== Early life ==
Abigail Jackson was born on March 14, 1830, in Portland Township, Frontenac County, Upper Canada. Other sources give March 14, 1831, for the same place of birth. Her father, Elijah Jackson, was a United Empire Loyalist and a Dutch immigrant to New York who later settled in Canada, while her mother, Marie Grozaine, was French-Canadian.

Becker was noted for her height, reportedly standing 180 cm (6 ft) tall as a teenager. In her youth, she twice rescued people from drowning: first pulling a child from the deep shaft of a well and later saving a man who could not swim from a Nanticoke lake. At age 17, she married Jeremiah Becker, a widower with six children who was a trapper from Long Point, Ontario, in 1848.

== Long Point rescues ==
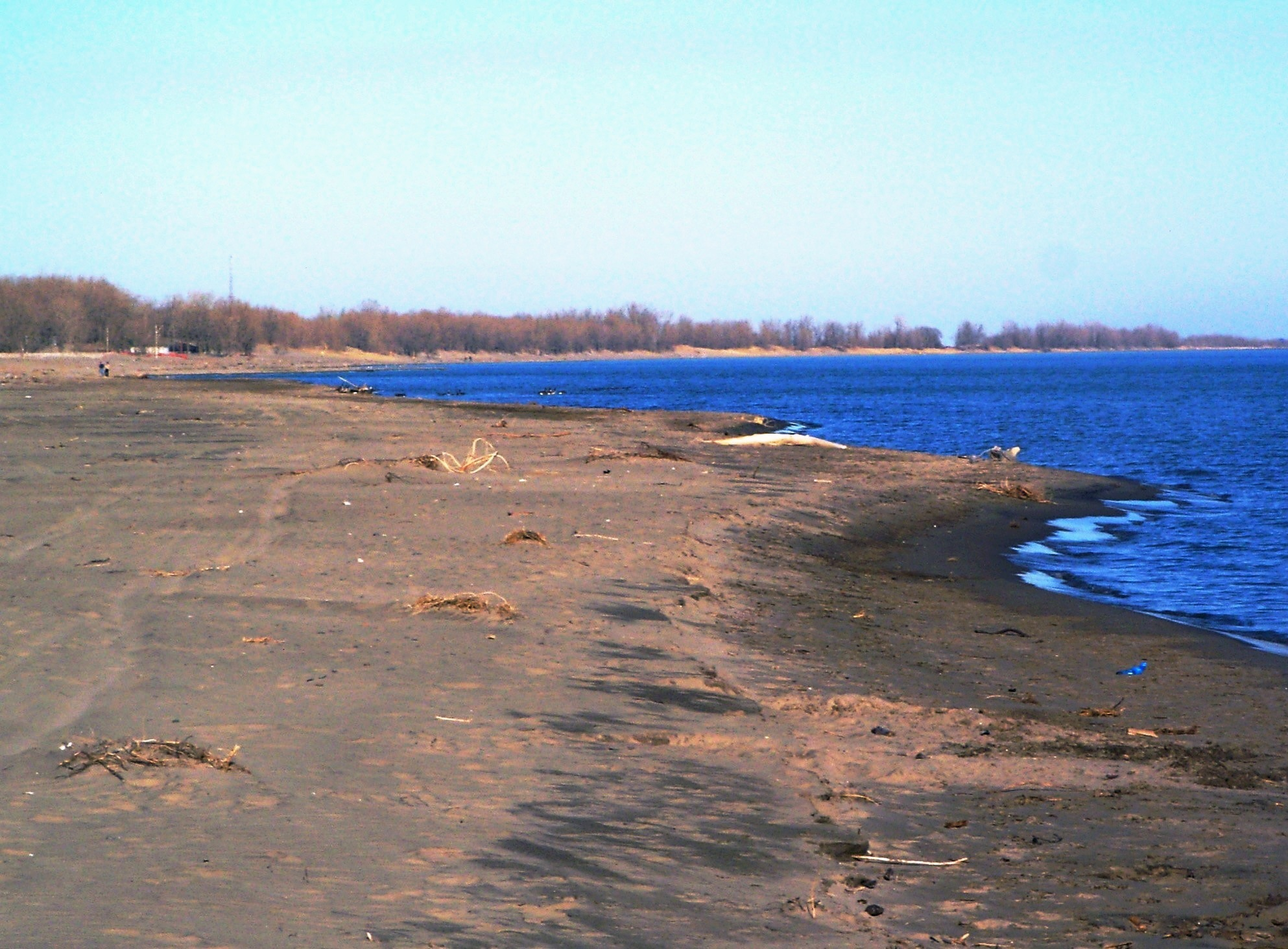
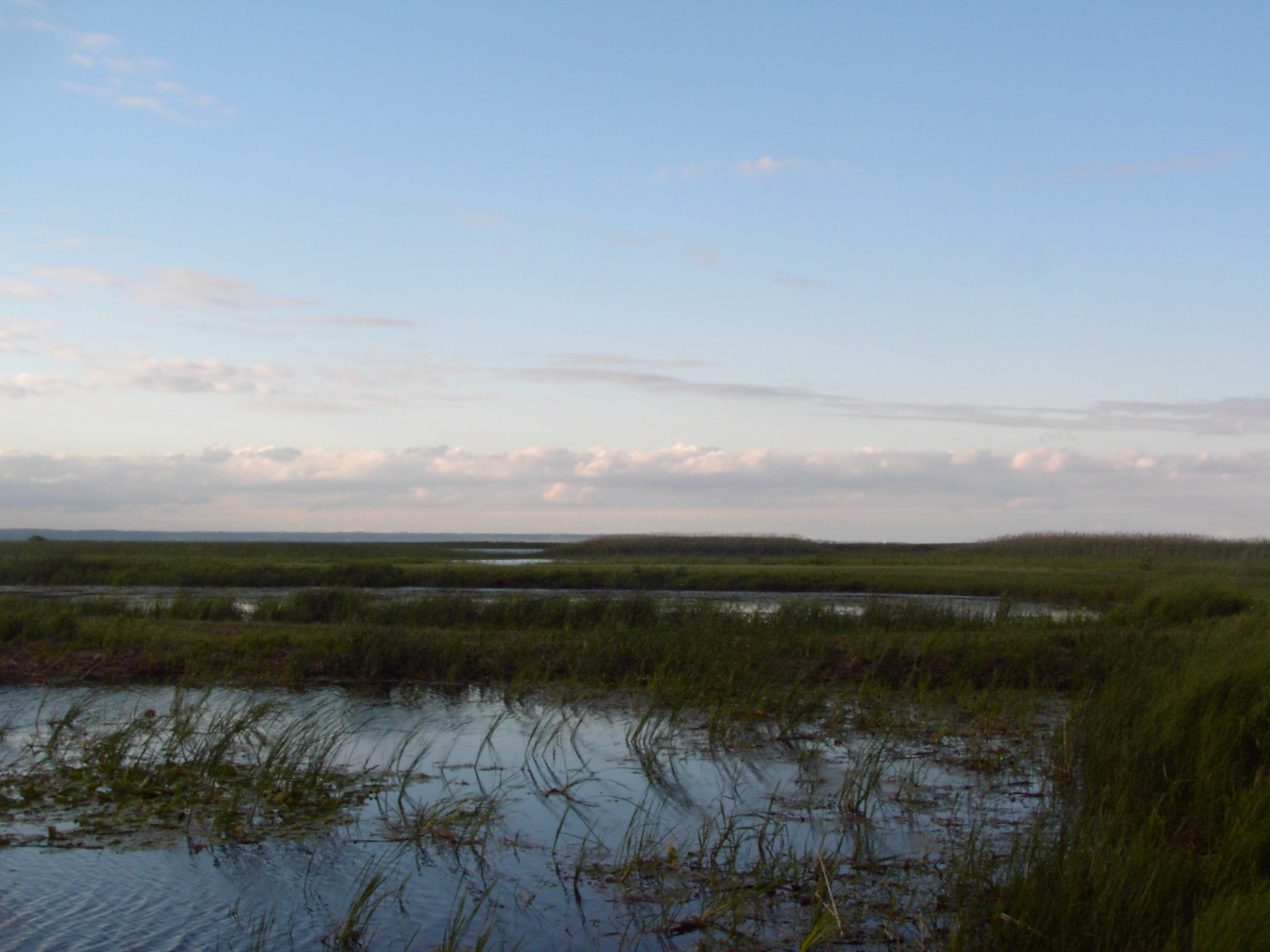
Long Point beaches and marshes, near the Beckers' original farmstead. The ship rescues, hunting, and trapping occurred in these environments.

The Beckers lived in poverty, isolated on Long Point, with little access to supplies beyond what Jeremiah could carry from the mainland. Abigail joined her husband Jeremiah in trapping muskrats on Long Point and helped prepare the skins for sale. Jeremiah sold skins to boatmen and small-craft skippers who occasionally landed on the island, sustaining the family in near-total isolation. They rarely saw or met visitors. Prior to November 23, 1854, Jeremiah Becker had traveled to the mainland to sell pelts and purchase winter supplies for the family. At that time, only Abigail, her children, and the Old Cut Lighthouse keeper were reportedly on the island.

Long Point was known for shipwrecks; according to one tally, as many as seven vessels were lost off its shores in 1851. Ships and lives were regularly lost to violent fall storms in the area; historian Dwight Boyer wrote that ships who pressed into the rough autumn storms "usually left their bones, and sometimes those of their people, on the Point forever."

=== Conductor shipwreck ===
On November 22–23, 1854, the Buffalo-based schooner Conductor, laden with grains, sailed past Long Point and ran aground in a storm around midnight en route to Port Dalhousie. The crew clung to the frozen rigging in the darkness throughout the stormy night, until the sun rose seven hours later. In the early afternoon, as the blizzard began to clear, Becker came upon the wrecked Conductor grounded roughly two hundred metres/yards from shore, its crew still trapped in the rigging.

Abigail built a fire on the beach with her children and spent most of the day shouting over the storm, trying to coax the sailors to shore. Just at nightfall there was a slight break in the storm. Despite being unable to swim, Becker waded shoulder-deep into the icy lake to assist the stranded crew, coaxing them to leave the rigging and make for shore. In B. D. Calvert's The Story of Abigail Becker (1899), Becker's stepdaughter Margaret Wheeler (née Becker) described the crew as weakened by cold, with several needing her mother's help to reach shore and recover by the fire.

Becker repeatedly entered the crashing waves to reach struggling men. At one point, she rescued both the ship's mate and her own disabled son who attempted to assist, after both men were swept underwater, pulling them out together and staggering up the beach with them. Roy F. Fleming of the National Museum of the Great Lakes recounted that Becker rescued the sailors successively, even re-entering the surf to save men pulled back by the undertow. One sailor, who like Abigail could not swim, was the last to be rescued and had lashed himself to the rigging to avoid drowning and being swept away in the storm. Abigail, with some of the recovering crew, finally created a makeshift raft of wood from the wreck of the Conductor, reached the last sailor, and saved him. The storm continued for four days, with the eight-person Conductor crew stranded at the Becker homestead until Jeremiah returned.

The rescue of the Conductor crew went unreported until retired Buffalo lake ship captain E. P. Dorr investigated the wreck near Long Point Island. Dorr spoke with another lake ship captain, who recounted the rescue of the Conductor's crew. He also spoke with the keepers of the Old Cut Lighthouse, who shared the same account of Abigail Becker's actions. When Dorr visited the Becker cabin, he found the family living in poverty, all barefoot and thinly clothed for the cold winter. On being thanked, Becker replied, "I don't know as I did more 'n I'd ought to, nor more 'n I'd do again." In gratitude, Dorr sent clothing and supplies to the family and publicized her actions among Great Lakes sailors.

Fleming attributed Becker's identity and naming as the "Angel of Long Point" to the sailors she rescued in 1851. They said to Becker upon their departure from Long Point, "...to you, the Guardian Angel of Long Point Bay, we owe our lives."

=== Later shipwrecks ===
In another incident, four sailors reached the Becker cabin during a severe snowstorm after their ship had wrecked nearby. They were only four of six survivors from a schooner wrecked the previous night; the other two had collapsed about a mile away. Becker welcomed the men to warm themselves by the fire, then set out into the storm with two of her sons and spare clothing to find the missing pair. She found the missing sailors in the storm and persuaded them to return, ensuring that all six crew members survived.

During another late autumn gale, a schooner laden with barley went ashore near the Becker cabin. All hands were rescued and safely came to shore on their own. They were cared for by the Beckers, except for the cook, a woman, who went unaccounted for. One morning, one of Becker's daughters ran to the cabin, crying, "Mother! Mother! there's a woman in the schooner waving her arms at me!". Though she did not initially believe the child, Becker went to investigate anyway. She found the schooner's cook alive in the wreck after she had been presumed lost by the crew.

=== Public recognition ===
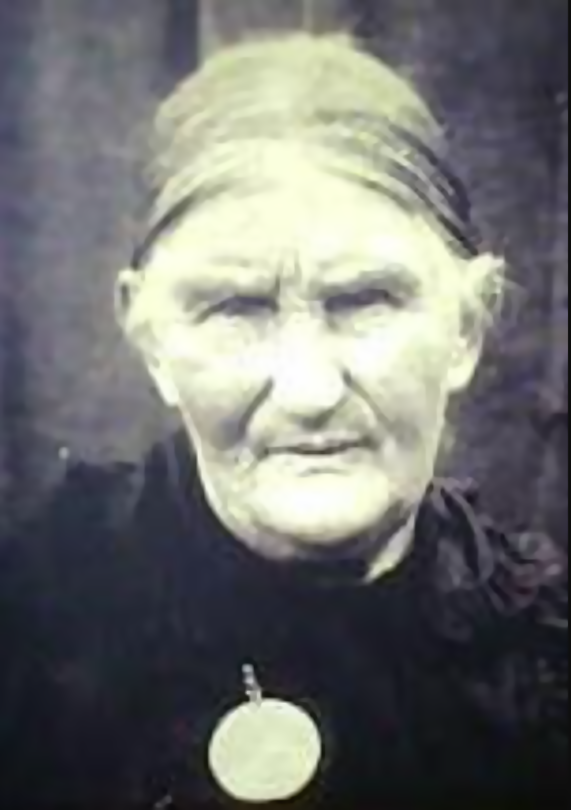
Abigail Becker, the Angel of Long Point

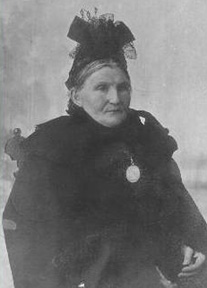
Becker wearing her medal

Abigail was awarded $535 ($19,171 in 2025) by merchants and sailors from Buffalo, but had to involve law enforcement to recover the funds after a customs official in Port Rowan diverted the money. The New York Life Saving Benevolent Association struck a gold medal in her honour, and the Royal Humane Society awarded her a medal as well. While meeting in Quebec City, the Canadian Parliament passed a motion granting her family forty hectares (100 acres) of land in Norfolk County as a token of gratitude.

The Governor General of Canada, John Hamilton-Gordon, 1st Marquess of Aberdeen and Temair, sent her a personal letter of commendation. In 1860, the Prince of Wales (later King Edward VII), while visiting Long Point on a duck-hunting expedition, presented her with a gift. Queen Victoria sent her a handwritten letter of congratulations and £50 (equivalent to £5,256 in 2025). She was offered money to tour the United States but declined, not wishing to be exhibited. On receiving public recognition, Becker typically dismissed praise, saying, "I only did my duty as any other would have done."

== Later life ==
The Becker family's cabin and small farm on Long Point proved difficult to maintain. Abigail was frequently injured: once thrown by a horse, breaking her foot, and on four separate occasions she broke an arm and set it herself. She eventually left Long Point and settled with her family on a farm near North Walsingham, purchased in part with reward money presented in Buffalo, including a gold medal and a $1,000 ($35,833 in 2025) purse from the New York Life Saving Association. Becker used the funds to acquire a twenty-hectare (50-acre) property but was forced to go to court to obtain the promised payment, ultimately receiving only $535 of the $550 ($19,708 in 2025) collected. Despite the financial strain, she worked to sustain and improve the homestead through her own labor.

Jeremiah, untrained in agriculture, struggled with the land, and the holding soon declined. Tragedy followed when one of their sons drowned in Port Rowan Bay. Jeremiah later returned to trapping and fishing expeditions on Long Point. In January 1864, Jeremiah fled rising waters during a winter gale on foot. He perished from exposure; his body was found three months later. Abigail was left to raise their children alone.

She later married Henry Rohrer, with whom she had three additional daughters. Over the years, she adopted and raised two more children, raising a total of nineteen children. Abigail lived the remainder of her life in Walsingham Township, remaining on the farm she had been granted and building a household there with her second husband. After the hardships of her early life, Becker lived out her later years in modest prosperity.

Becker died on March 21, 1905, at the age of seventy-five, was honored with a civil funeral, and is buried in Oakwood Cemetery, Simcoe, Ontario. She was interred wearing her medals, with the Bible gifted decades earlier by Captain Dorr placed beside her.

== Legacy ==
The Abigail Becker Ward was established at Simcoe Town Hospital—now Norfolk General Hospital—where her portrait hangs. Abigail Becker Parkway on Long Point, as well as a parking lot, bear her name. The Abigail Becker Conservation Area includes part of the land where her family farm once stood in Norfolk County.

On September 10, 1958, a plaque honouring Becker as the "Heroine of Long Point" was placed by the Archaeological and Historic Sites Board of Ontario at Port Rowan. Relics from Becker's life are displayed in the Eva Brook Donly Museum of Art and Antiques in Simcoe. Becker has been part of an exhibit at the Smithsonian Institution.

=== Poetry and song ===
Songs and poems have been written about Becker. Poet and inventor Amanda T. Jones wrote in her poem Abigail Becker:

Sped Mother Becker, 'Children, wake;
A ship's gone down, they're needing me;
Your father's off on shore; the lake
Is just a raging sea'

She sought the men, she sought them far,
Three fathoms down she gripped them tight,
With both together up the bar
She staggered into sight.

Calvert's 1899 account was based on the recollections of Becker's stepdaughter Margaret Becker Wheeler, whom Calvert described as present on Long Point during the wreck, caring for the younger children and later helping tend the rescued men. A 1919 Niagara Historical Society publication, while itself recounting the crippled stepson's attempt to assist during the rescue, criticized Calvert for altering Jones's poem to substitute a stanza about the stepson for one about the mate, and reproduced the two stanzas for comparison.

Original Jones:

Oh life is dear: the mate leaps in.
I know the Captain said right well:
Not twice can any woman win
A soul from yonder hell.

Calvert revision:

Her crippled stepson now comes down
To mother's help he wants to go
And heeding not his mother's frown
He tries what he can do.

Calvert also omitted a separate stanza from Jones's poem, stating that Becker herself requested that verse thirteen be left out. In the version published in The Ontario High School Reader, verse thirteen read:

Get wood, cook fish, make ready all.
She snatch'd her stores, she fled with haste,
In cotton gown and tatter'd shawl,
Barefoot across the waste.

== See also ==
- Grace Darling – British lighthouse keeper's daughter (1815–1842)
- Ida Lewis – American lighthouse keeper (1842–1911)
- Grace Bussell – Western Australian heroine
- Ann Harvey – Canadian fisher and rescuer (1811–1860)
- Roberta Boyd
