= Charles Raymond Smith =

British sculptor (1798–1888)

Charles Raymond Smith (1798–1888) was a 19th-century British sculptor.

== Life ==
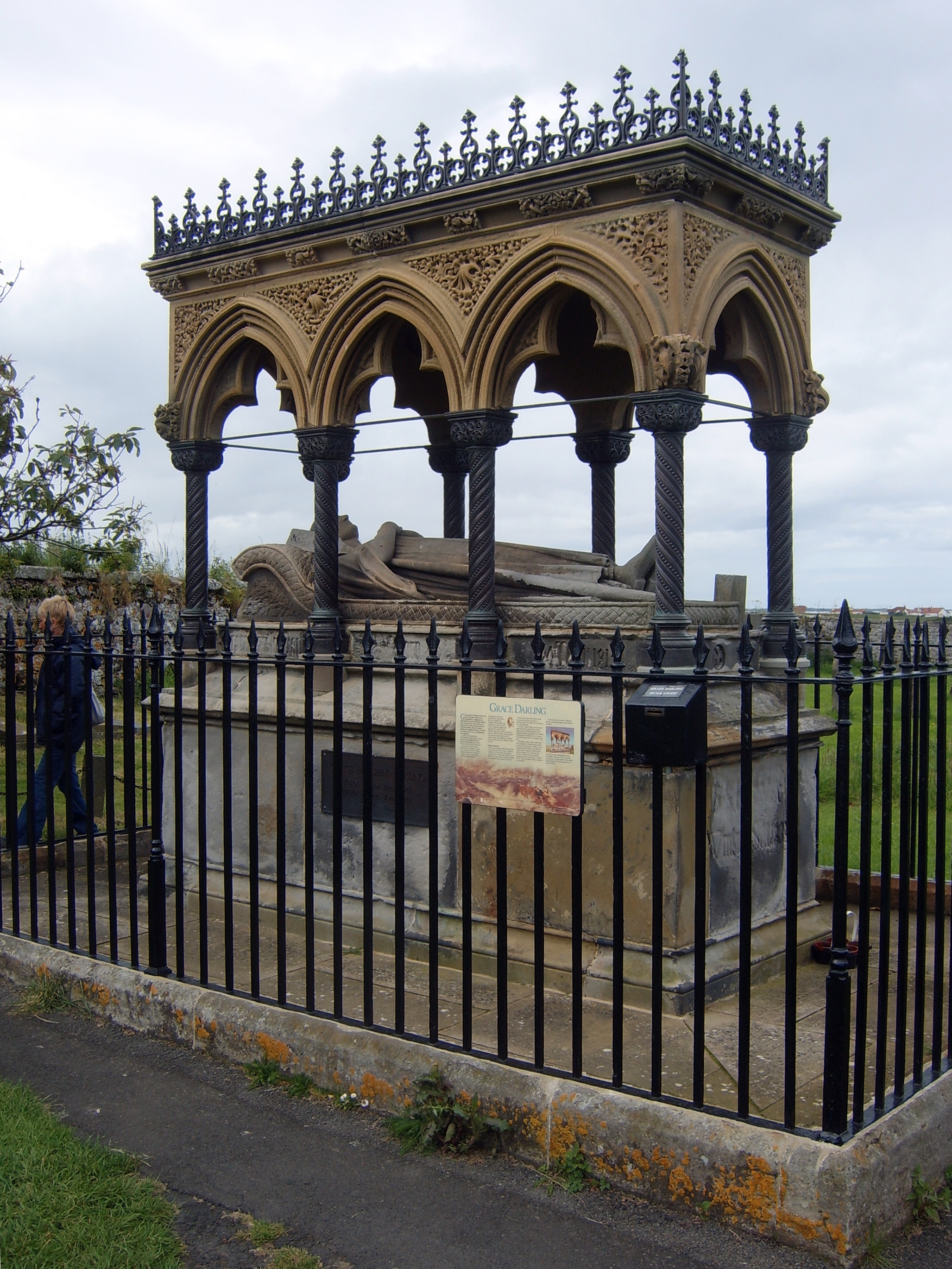
Monument to Grace Darling in Bamburgh

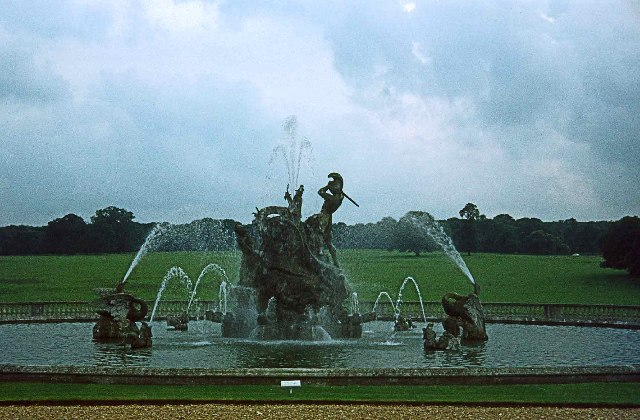
St George and the Dragon Fountain at Holkham Hall, Norfolk

He was born in Marylebone in London the son of James Smith, a sculptor of some renown. Charles won the Silver Isis Medal from the Society of Arts in 1817 and their Gold Isis Medal in 1821 for a group of two figures. He attended the Royal Academy Schools from 1816 and won a silver medal in 1821 and the Large Gold Medal (their main prize) in 1822 for "The Fight for the Body of Patroclus".

He obtained a post as assistant to William Tollemache prior to working for J P P Kendrick.

He exhibited at the Royal Academy from 1820 to 1840 and at the British Institution from 1829 to 1833.

He died at 246 Marylebone Road on 15 April 1888.

== Works ==
- Bust of Mr Ricci (1820)
- Statue of Rev Thomas Dunham Whitaker at Whalley, Lancashire (1822)
- Monument to Major Sayer at Clare, Suffolk (1823)
- Bust of Edward Goldsmith (1827)
- Monument to George Holroyd at Reigate (1827)
- Monument to James Hudson at Newington-by-Sittingbourne (1827)
- Monument to William Williams in Chichester Cathedral (1828)
- Monument to Elizabeth Rose in Carshalton (1829)
- Monument to the Countess of Clonmell at Marylebone Parish Church (1829)
- Bust of Col Dalrymple (1830)
- Monument to Mary Walker at Sand Hutton (1830)
- Bust of George Campbell of New York (1831)
- Statuary at Mamhead Park (the kings and queens of England) for Sir Robert Newman (1838 to 1842)
- Tomb of Jacob Britton in Durham Cathedral (1839)
- Statues of Raphael and Michelangelo for Lord Lansdowne at Bowood House (1841)
- Bust of Winthrop Praed (1841)
- Bust of Rev Thomas Gisborne at Durham University (1841)
- Wall monument to Samuel Sparshott in St Ann's Church, HMNB Portsmouth (1851)
- Pair of bronze stags and a fountain for Pynes House in Exeter (1852)
- St George and the Dragon Fountain at Holkham Hall
- Tomb of Grace Darling at Bamburgh churchyard

== Family ==
He was father to Charles John Thomas Smith who was also a sculptor.
