= The McManus =

Historic building housing an art gallery and museum in Dundee, Scotland

The McManus: Dundee's Art Gallery and Museum
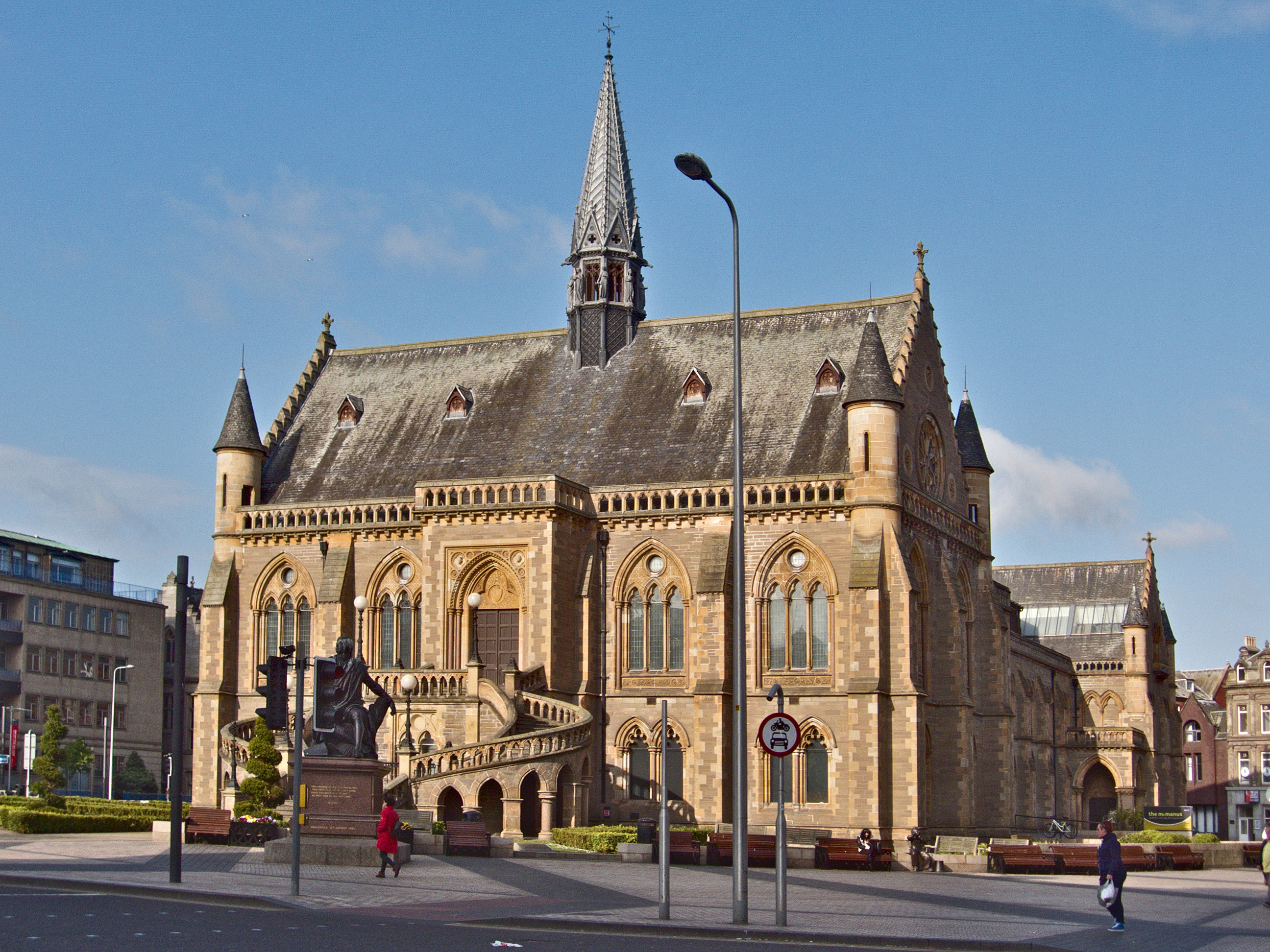

- Location in the City of Dundee
- Former name: Albert Institute
- Established: 1867
- Location: Dundee, Scotland
- Coordinates: 56.462564°N 2.971156°W
- Website: www.mcmanus.co.uk

The McManus: Dundee's Art Gallery and Museum is a Gothic Revival-style building, located in the centre of Dundee, Scotland. The building houses a museum and art gallery with a collection of fine and decorative art as well as a natural history collection. It is protected as a Category A listed building.

== History ==
The concept for the building was originally commissioned as a memorial to Prince Albert and intended to contain room for lectures, museum, picture gallery and a reference library for students by the British Association for the Advancement of Science. It was agreed that the funding for the building should be provided by the inhabitants of Dundee. Although the city could not afford such a lavish memorial outright, it did contribute £300. A guaranteed fund of £4,205 15/- from 168 contributors was collected, which included a large donation from the Baxter family that totalled £420.

The building was designed by the architect George Gilbert Scott, who was an expert for the restoration of medieval churches and advocate of the Gothic architectural style. He intended to design a large tower like in his previous work at St. Nikolai, Hamburg. The foundations were situated in a small wetland called Quaw Bog at the confluence of the Scourin Burn and Friar Burn, which has since been drained. This meant that the area under the building site was underpinned by large wood beams. However, when construction began in 1865, the ground proved too unstable to support the larger tower that he envisaged. The building was opened as the Albert Institute in 1867.

Two further sections, which extended the building by four art galleries and four museum galleries, were added by 1889. The central section was designed to Scott's intention by David MacKenzie.

== The Victoria Gallery ==
The building's Victoria Gallery extension was designed by Dundee industrialist James Guthrie Orchar and town architect William Alexander.

== Administration and renaming ==
The contents of the Watt Institute, founded in 1848, were incorporated into the collection before the opening of the civic museum and art gallery in 1873.

Between 1873 and 1949, the buildings were administrered as part of public library service. From 1959, the city corporation took over the running of the administration. Following a later refurbishment, the building now commemorates Maurice McManus, the Lord Provost from 1962 to 1967. Initially retitled McManus Galleries, after refurbishment in 2010, it is now formally known as The McManus: Dundee's Art Gallery and Museum.

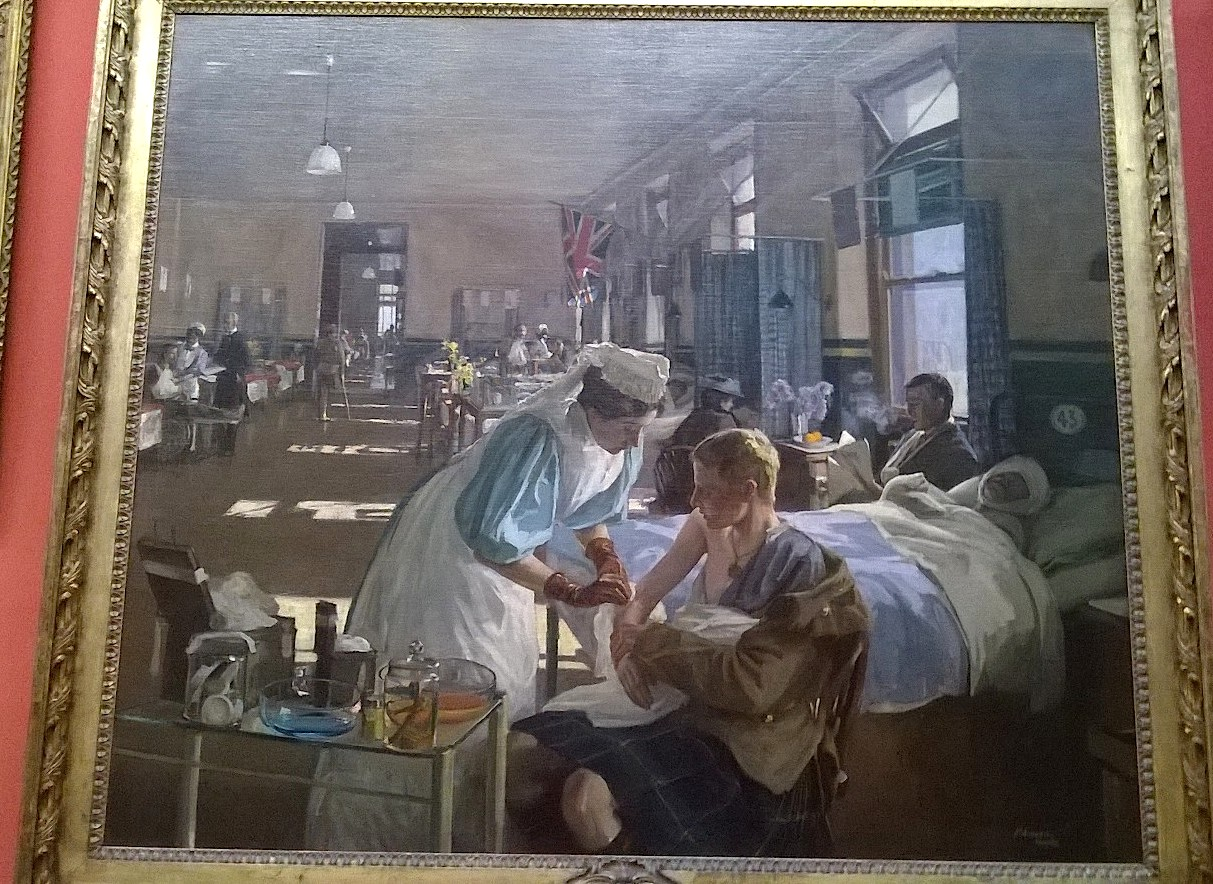
Sir John Lavery RA RSA RHA (1856–1941). 1915. Oil on canvas. 1915. 175.6 x 200.7 cm. Collection: The McManus: Dundee's Art Gallery and Museum.

== Redevelopment ==
In 1976, cracks were discovered in south-east corner of the building. The subsequent survey found that the building was partially subsiding. During 1979, remedial measures involved placing load-bearing concrete piles and cross-beams positioned to replace rotted timbers.

The building was closed to the public on 24 October 2005 for a £7.8-million redevelopment by Page\Park Architects and was reopened to the public on 28 February 2010.

== Collection ==
While the 2005- 2010 redevelopment work was being carried out, much of the McManus collection, which includes works by Dundee-based artists James McIntosh Patrick and Alberto Morrocco, were relocated in at the former Carnegie Library on Barrack Street.

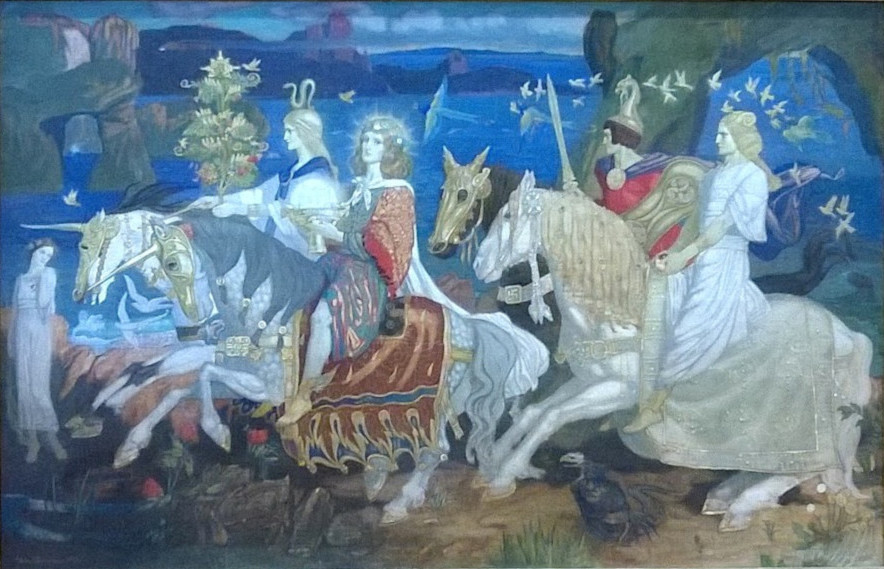
The Riders of the Sidhe by John Duncan, 1911. McManus Galleries, Dundee.

The collection includes three paintings by Thomas Musgrave Joy which celebrate Grace Darling's rescue of passengers on the paddlesteamer Forfarshire.
