= Grace Darling =

British lighthouse keeper's daughter (1815–1842)

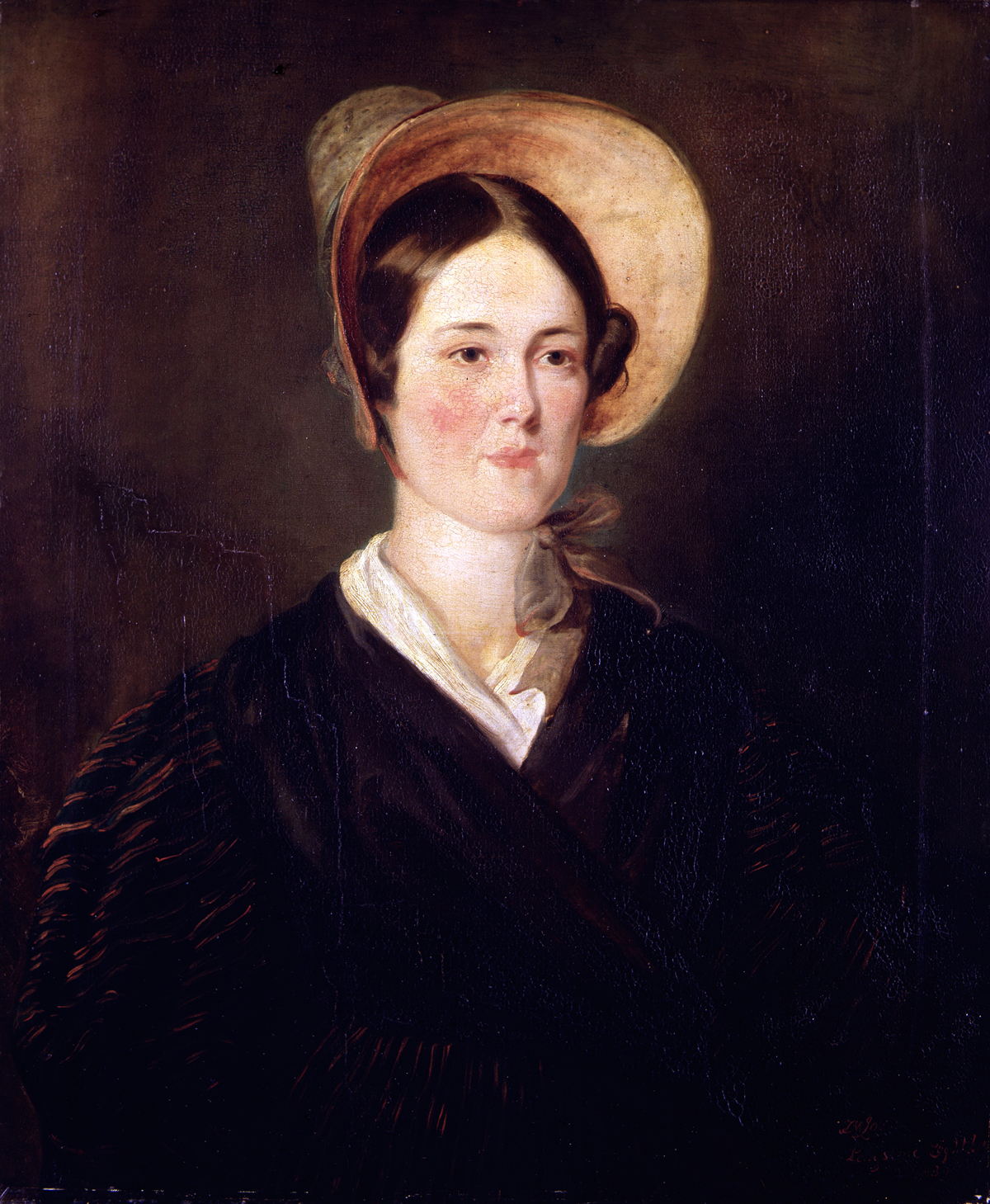
- Portrait by Thomas Musgrave Joy, 1839
- Born: 24 November 1815; Bamburgh, England
- Died: 20 October 1842 (aged 26); Bamburgh, England
- Resting place: St Aidan's churchyard, Bamburgh; 55°38.63′N 01°36.58′W
- Occupation: Lighthouse keeper
- Parent(s): William and Thomasin Darling
- Awards: Silver Medal for Bravery by the Royal National Institution for the Preservation of Life from Shipwreck

Grace Horsley Darling (24 November 1815 – 20 October 1842) was an English lighthouse keeper's daughter. Her participation in the rescue of survivors from the shipwrecked Forfarshire in 1838 brought her national fame. The paddlesteamer ran aground on the Farne Islands off the coast of Northumberland in northeast England; eight members of the crew and one passenger, Sarah Dawson, were saved.

== Early life ==
Grace Darling was born on 24 November 1815, at her grandfather's house in Bamburgh, Northumberland. It is the last cottage of the row facing St Aidan's church. She was the seventh of nine children (four brothers and four sisters), born to William and Thomasin Darling.

House where Grace Darling was born, Bamburgh

In December 1815, when she was only a few weeks old, she was taken to live on Brownsman Island, one of the Farne Islands, in a small cottage attached to the lighthouse.

Remains of old lighthouse, keeper's cottage and beacon, Brownsman Island

William Darlings's father Robert was appointed as lighthouse keeper at Brownsman island in 1795. William was employed by Trinity House as a boatman to the Farne Island lighthouses, progressing to be assistant lighthouse keeper shortly after his marriage to Thomasin Horsley in 1805. Following the death of Robert Darling in September 1815, William was appointed keeper of the Brownsman light.

William earned a salary of £70 per annum (equivalent to £5,400 in 2025), with a bonus of £10 for satisfactory service. His income was supplemented by rewards from the Crewe Trustees; for reporting wrecks, saving life and salvaging goods. Further income came from occasional visitors such as bird-watchers and naturalists. Despite the remote location and the basic accommodation, the Darling family were well supplied with provisions from Trinity House, supplemented by produce from their own smallholding.

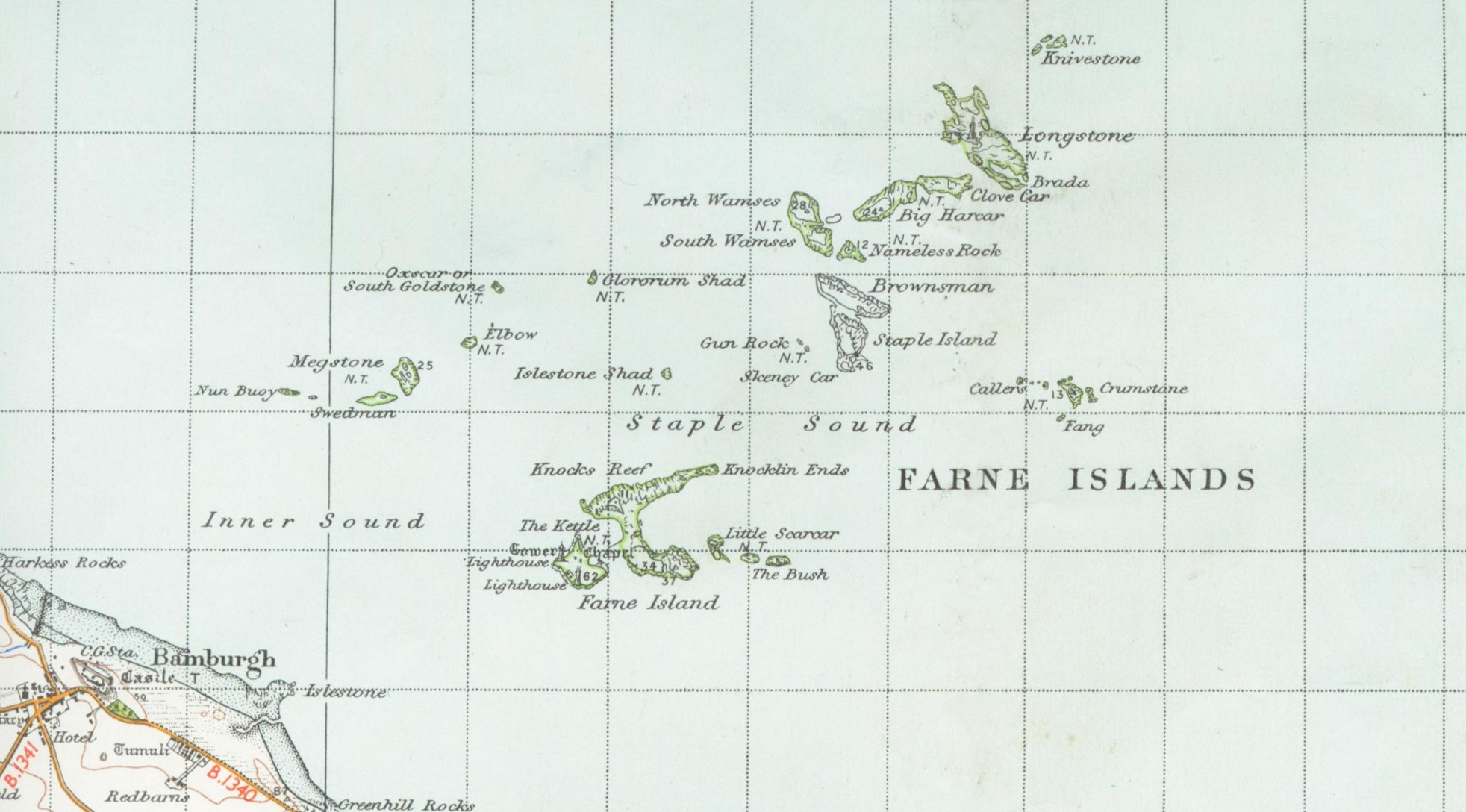
Farne Islands from a map of 1947

The Brownsman light had originally been privately funded, and was constructed in one of the few places also able to accommodate a lighthouse keeper. The light was no more than a bonfire, fuelled by coal and wood, and lit on top of a 40 ft (12 m) tower. It was only in 1810 that an oil-fuelled revolving light with silvered copper reflectors was installed. However, it was still not located in the best position, and in 1825, work was commissioned by Trinity House to construct a new lighthouse on the more remote and barren Longstone Island.

The Darling family moved to Longstone Lighthouse in 1826, with the light first operated on 15 February. The lighthouse had better accommodation, but the island itself was slightly less hospitable, the rock only a few feet above the water at high tide, and submerged in exceptional tides.

William retained his smallholding on Brownsman island, and would row back to gather vegetables from their former garden and to feed the animals. The family spent most of their time on the ground floor of the lighthouse, which consisted of a large room, heated by a wood stove. The room was their living room, dining room, and kitchen in one, and had a spiral staircase leading to three bedrooms above and the light at the top of the tower.

== Shipwreck ==
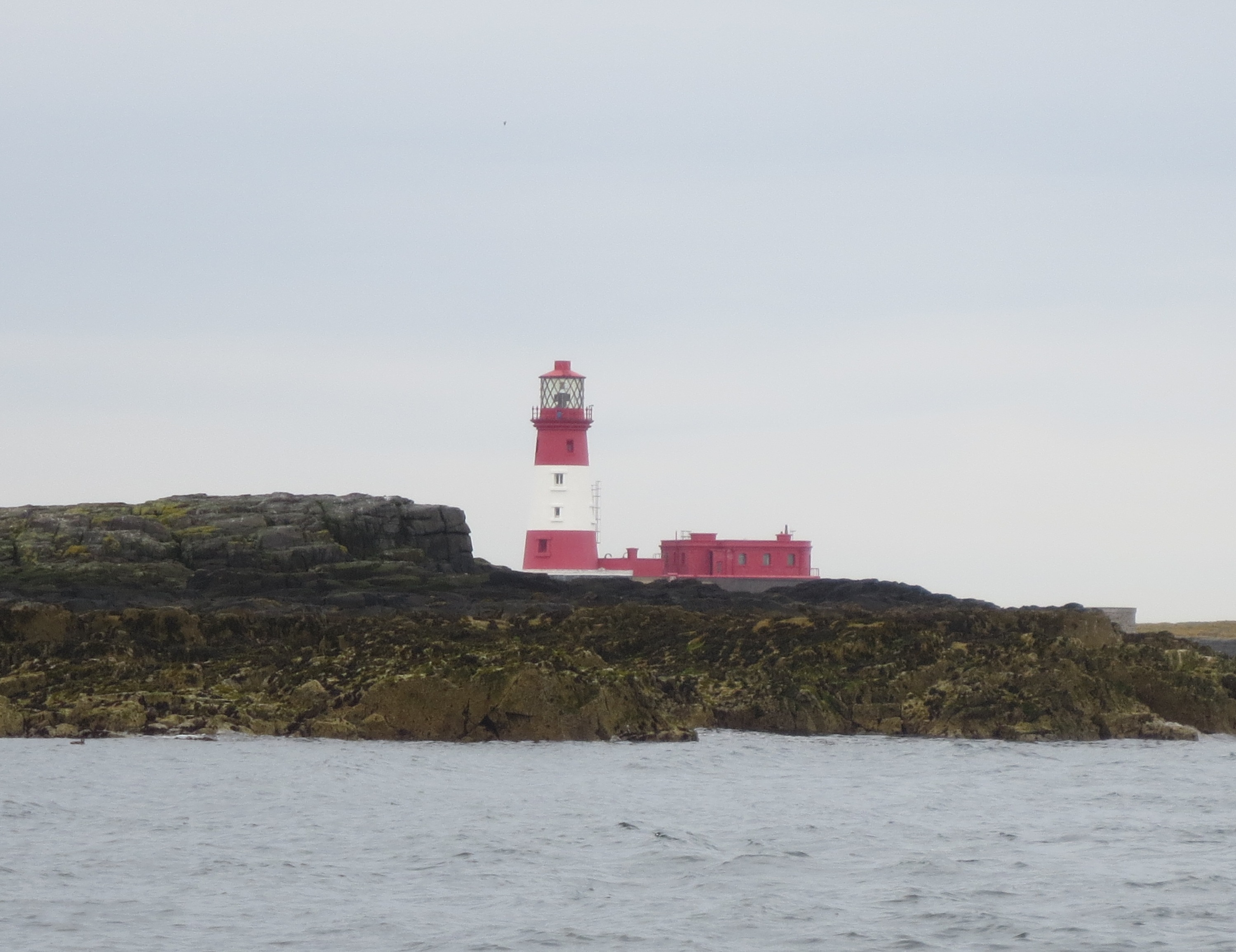
Lighthouse at Longstone: The upper window in the white ring was Grace Darling's bedroom, from which she saw the wreckage of the Forfarshire.

In the early hours of 7 September 1838, Darling, looking from an upstairs window, spotted the wreck and survivors of the Forfarshire on Big Harcar, a nearby low, rocky island. The Forfarshire had foundered on the rocks and broken in half; one of the halves had sunk during the night.

Darling and her father, William, determined that the weather was too rough for the lifeboat to put out from Seahouses (then North Sunderland), so they took a rowing boat (a 21 ft or 6.5 m, four-man Northumberland coble) across to the survivors, taking a long route that kept to the lee side of the islands, a distance of nearly a mile (about 1.5 km). Darling kept the coble steady in the water, while her father helped four men and the lone surviving woman, Sarah Dawson, into the boat. Although she survived the sinking, Dawson had lost her two young children (James, 7, and Matilda, 5) during the night. William and three of the rescued men then rowed the boat back to the lighthouse. Darling then remained at the lighthouse while William and three of the rescued crew members rowed back and recovered four more survivors.

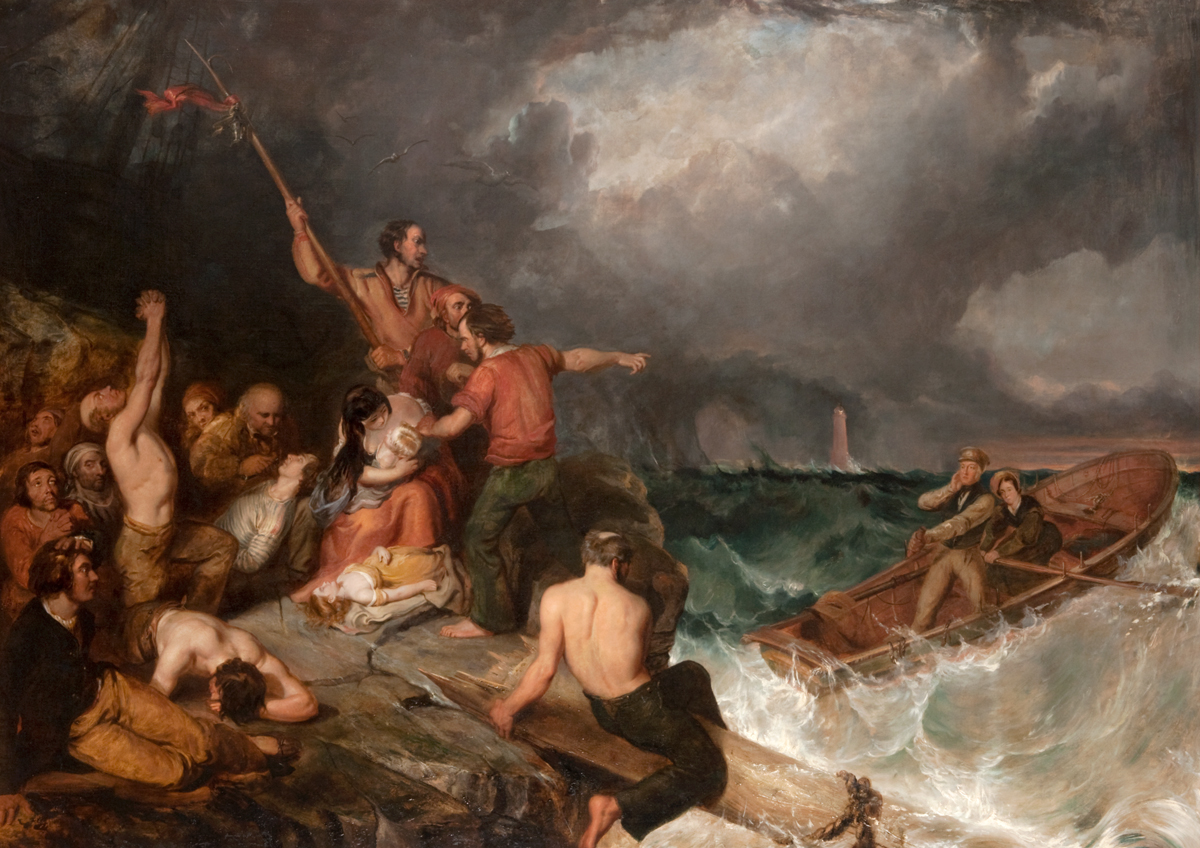
Grace Darling at the Forfarshire by Thomas Musgrave Joy

Meanwhile, the lifeboat had set out from Seahouses, but arrived at Big Harcar rock after Darling and her father had completed their rescue operation; all they found were the bodies of Dawson's children and a clergyman. Returning to North Sunderland was too dangerous, so they rowed to the lighthouse to take shelter. Darling's brother, William Brooks Darling, was one of the seven fishermen in the lifeboat. The weather deteriorated to the extent that everyone was obliged to remain at the lighthouse for three days before returning to shore.

The Forfarshire had been carrying 62 people. The vessel broke in two almost immediately upon hitting the rocks. Those rescued by Darling and her father were from the bow section of the vessel, which had been held by the rocks for some time before sinking. All that remained at daybreak was the portside paddlebox casing. Nine other passengers and crew had managed to float off a lifeboat from the stern section before it, too, sank, and were picked up in the night by a passing Montrose sloop, and brought into South Shields that same night.

As news of her role in the rescue reached the public, her combination of bravery and simple virtue set her out as exemplary, and led to an uneasy role as the nation's heroine. Subscriptions and donations totaling over £700 (equivalent to about £67,100 in 2025) were raised for her, including £50 from Queen Victoria; more than a dozen portrait painters sailed to her island home to capture her likeness, and hundreds of gifts, letters, and even marriage proposals were delivered to her. Her unexpected wealth and fame were such that the Duke of Northumberland took on a role as her self-appointed guardian and founder of a trust, established to look after the donations offered to her. His personal gifts to her family were a timepiece and a silver teapot.

=== Awards ===
The following awards were made to Grace and her father William:

- Silver Medal, awarded by the RNIPLS
  Grace Darling – 1838
  William Darling – 1838
- Honorary Gold Medallion, awarded by the Royal Humane Society
  Grace Darling – 1838
  William Darling – 1838
- Honorary Silver Medal, awarded by the Glasgow Humane Society
  Grace Darling – 1838

== Death ==
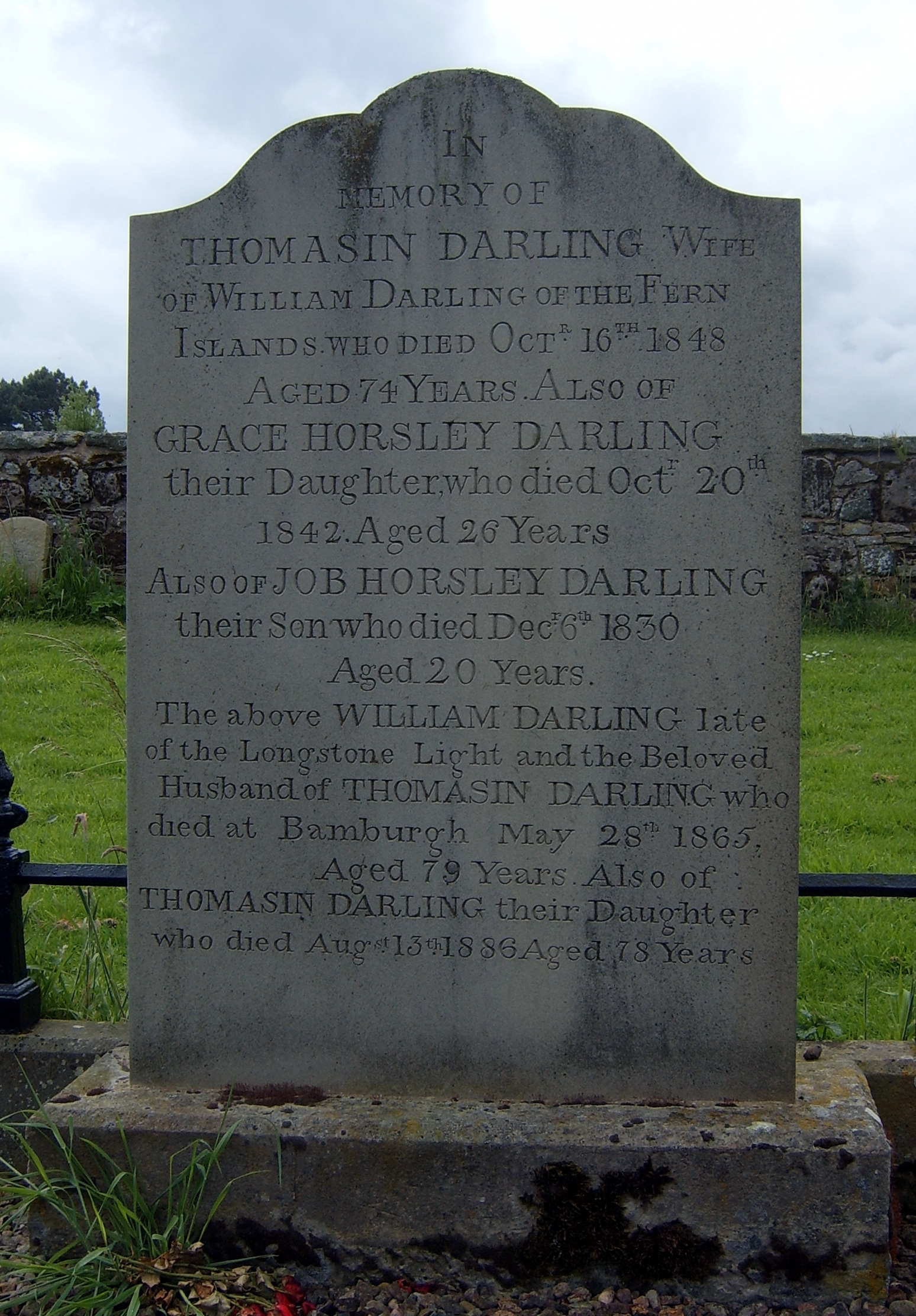
The replica headstone above the grave of Grace Darling and her family, St Aidan's churchyard, Bamburgh. The weathered original is on display at the RNLI Grace Darling Museum in Bamburgh.

In 1842, Darling fell ill with tuberculosis while visiting the mainland. According to letters at Northumberland Archives, Grace stayed with the Shields family in Wooler during late August and early September in an attempt to improve her health. A later letter shows that she moved to Alnwick with her mother in early October 1842. She then convalesced with her cousins, the MacFarlanes, in their house in Narrowgate, Alnwick. When the Duchess of Northumberland heard of her situation, she arranged for Darling to be moved to better accommodation close to Alnwick Castle. The Duchess tended to her in person, as well as providing her with the services of the ducal family physician.

However, Darling's condition declined and she was conveyed to the place of her birth in Bamburgh, where she died, aged 26, of consumption on 20 October 1842. She is buried in the churchyard of St Aidan's Church, Bamburgh. The Monument to Grace Darling was completed in 1842. It represents a sleeping effigy of her holding an oar, and lies to the north of her grave at the western edge of the churchyard so it would be visible to passing seafarers. The original effigy, which was sculpted by Charles Raymond Smith son of James Smith, was moved into the church in 1895 due to weathering.

Within the St Aidan's Church there is also a stained-glass window dedicated to the memory of Grace Darling.

== Legacy ==
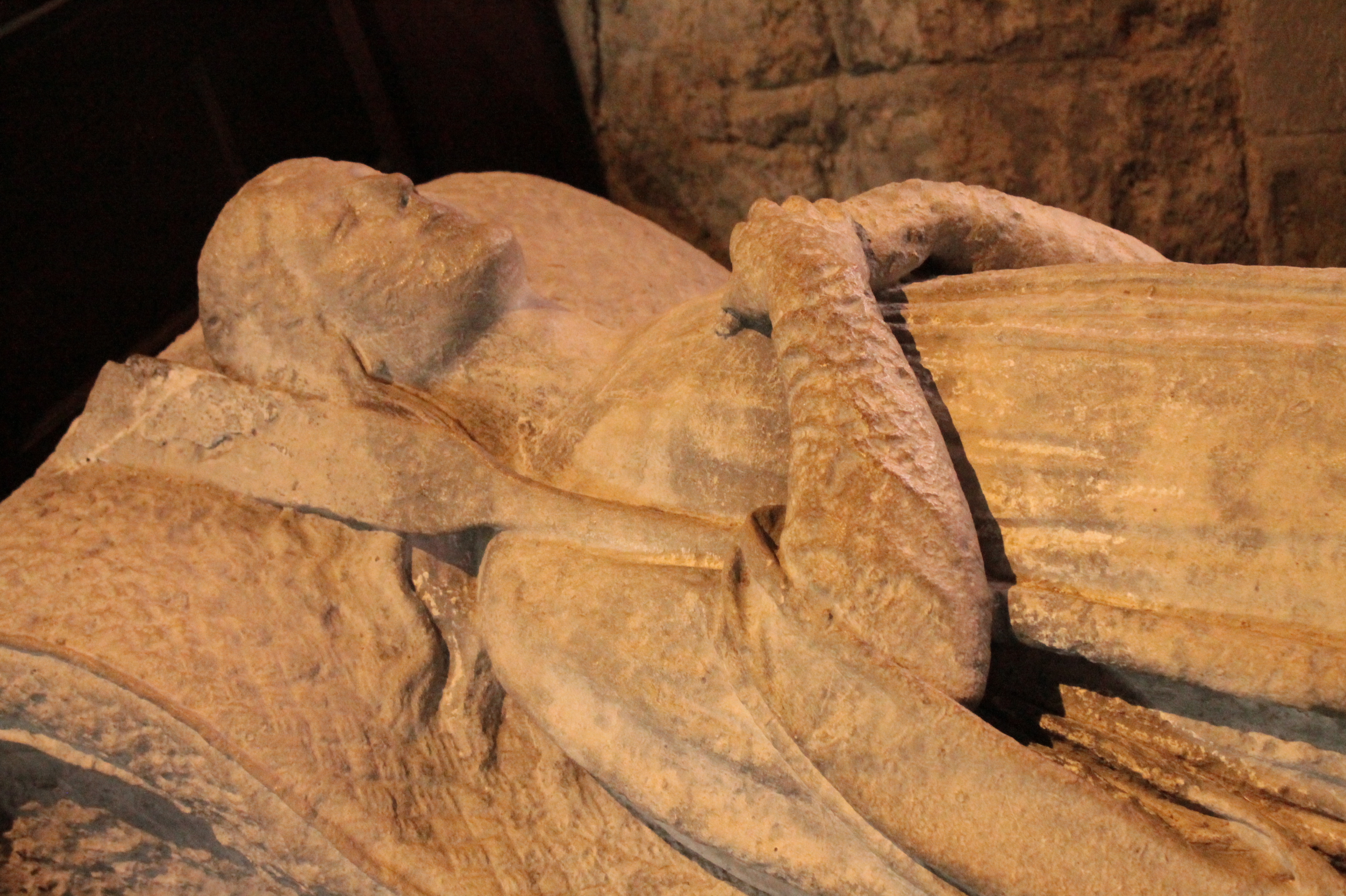
Original effigy of Grace Darling by Charles Raymond Smith in St Aidan's Church, Bamburgh

Darling's achievement was celebrated in her lifetime; she received a large financial reward in addition to the plaudits of the nation. A number of fictionalised depictions propagated the Grace Darling legend, such as Grace Darling, or the Maid of the Isles by Jerrold Vernon (1839), which gave birth to the legend of "the girl with windswept hair". Her deed was committed to verse by William Wordsworth in his poem "Grace Darling" (1843). In 1882 a four-act drama, Humanity, or a Passage in the Life of Grace Darling, premiered at the Theatre Royal, Leicester and immediately transferred to the vast Standard Theatre in London's Shoreditch. The play by Leonard Rae and Hugh Marston included a realistic representation of the sea rescue. In 1884, rose breeder Henry Bennett named the tea rose 'Grace Darling' after her. One of a series of Victorian paintings by William Bell Scott at Wallington Hall in Northumberland depicts her rescue efforts. The McManus Galleries in Dundee includes three paintings by Thomas Musgrave Joy that celebrate Grace Darling's deeds with the Forfarshire.

At Bamburgh, a museum is dedicated to her achievements and the seafaring life of the area. Singer/songwriter Dave Cousins of Strawbs wrote "Grace Darling" (on the album Ghosts) in tribute and as a love song. The folk singing group The Limeliters, accompanied by a children's chorus, sang a different "Grace Darling" (featuring the refrain "Help, help, came a desperate yelp!") in their 1962 album, recorded live in concert, Through Children's Eyes. In 2017, Duke Special set Michael Longley's poem "Grace Darling" to music and recorded it on the album Hallow. The 2018 novel, The Lighthouse Keepers Daughter by Hazel Gaynor is based around the story of Darling. The Grace Darling Hotel, one of the oldest extant hotels in Melbourne, Victoria, opened in 1854.

=== Grace Darling lifeboats ===
Mersey-class lifeboat 12-16 Grace Darling (ON 1173)

Eight RNLI lifeboats have carried the name Grace Darling, the first in 1851, just nine years after her death. In 1924 and 1925, two 45-foot Watson-class lifeboats, consecutively displayed at the British Empire Exhibition at Wembley, each carried the name Grace Darling, before being renamed when dispatched to their assigned stations.

For a brief period between 2018 and 2020, Seahouses Lifeboat Station (previously North Sunderland Lifeboat Station) operated both a Mersey-class All-weather lifeboat and a small D-class (IB1) inshore lifeboat at the same time, both bearing the name Grace Darling. The Mersey-class lifeboat was subsequently sold for further service with the Uruguay lifeboat service, and was named ADES 28 Grace Darling.

ON (Note: ON is the RNLI's Official Number of the boat.)	Op.No. (Note: Op. No. is the RNLI's Operational Number of the boat carried on the hull.)	Class	Built	On station	Station	Comments
Pre-240	–	28-foot Beeching self-righting (P&S)	1851	1852–1863	Tenby	(Note: 28 ft 0 in (8.53 m) x 7 ft 0 in (2.13 m) (10-oared) Beeching-class self-righting (P&S) lifeboat, funded by the SFMRBS, built by James Beeching of Great Yarmouth, costing £125.); Condemned and returned to London in 1863.
Pre-436	–	32-foot Prowse self-righting (P&S)	1865	1865–1884	Holy Island No.1	(Note: 32 ft 0 in (9.75 m) x 7 ft 4 in (2.24 m) (10-oared) Prowse-class self-righting (P&S) lifeboat, gift of Lady Watson of Midhurst, built by Woolfe of Shadwell, London, costing £226.); Damaged on service, and broken up in 1884.
1	–	34-foot 3in self-righting (P&S)	1884	1884–1909	Holy Island No.1	(Note: 34 ft 3 in (10.44 m) x 8 ft 3 in (2.51 m) (10-oared) self-righting (P&S) lifeboat, legacy of Miss A, Edgell of Alnwick, built by Woolfe of Shadwell, London, costing £363.); Broken up in 1910.
688	–	45-foot Watson	1924	1924	British Empire Exhibition	Renamed Lord Southborough (Civil Service No.1) at Margate.
695	–	45-foot Watson	1925	1925	British Empire Exhibition	Renamed M. O. Y. E. at Porthdinllaen.
927	–	Liverpool	1954	1954–1967	North Sunderland	Now on display in the RNLI Heritage Collection at Chatham Historic Dockyard.
927	–	Liverpool	1954	1967–1971	Relief fleet	Now on display in the RNLI Heritage Collection at Chatham Historic Dockyard.
927	–	Liverpool	1954	1971–1984	Youghal	Now on display in the RNLI Heritage Collection at Chatham Historic Dockyard.
1173	12-16	Mersey	1991	1991–2020	North Sunderland	Sold to ADES Uruguay, renamed ADES 28 Grace Darling.
–	D-828	D-class (IB1)	2018	2018–present	Seahouses	

More post-service details can be found on the respective lifeboat class pages.
Pre ON numbers are unofficial numbers used by the Lifeboat Enthusiasts' Society to reference early lifeboats not included on the official RNLI list.

== Gallery ==
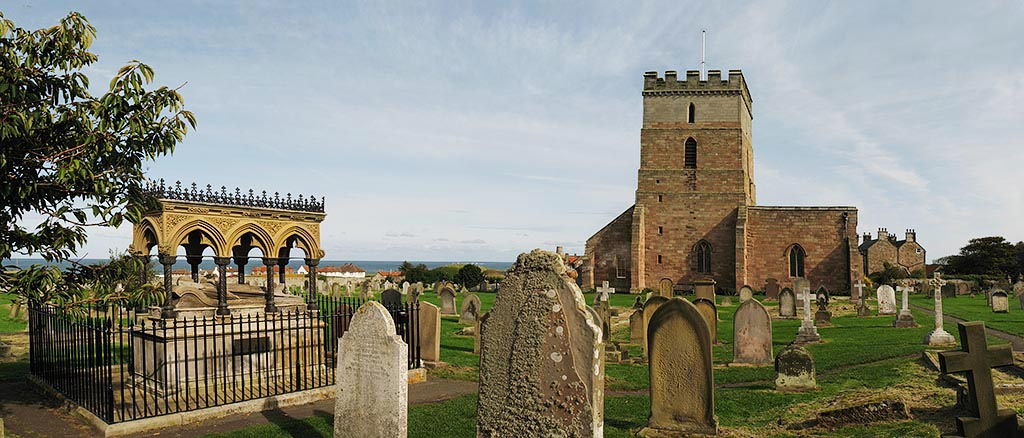
Panorama of St Aidan's churchyard, Bamburgh

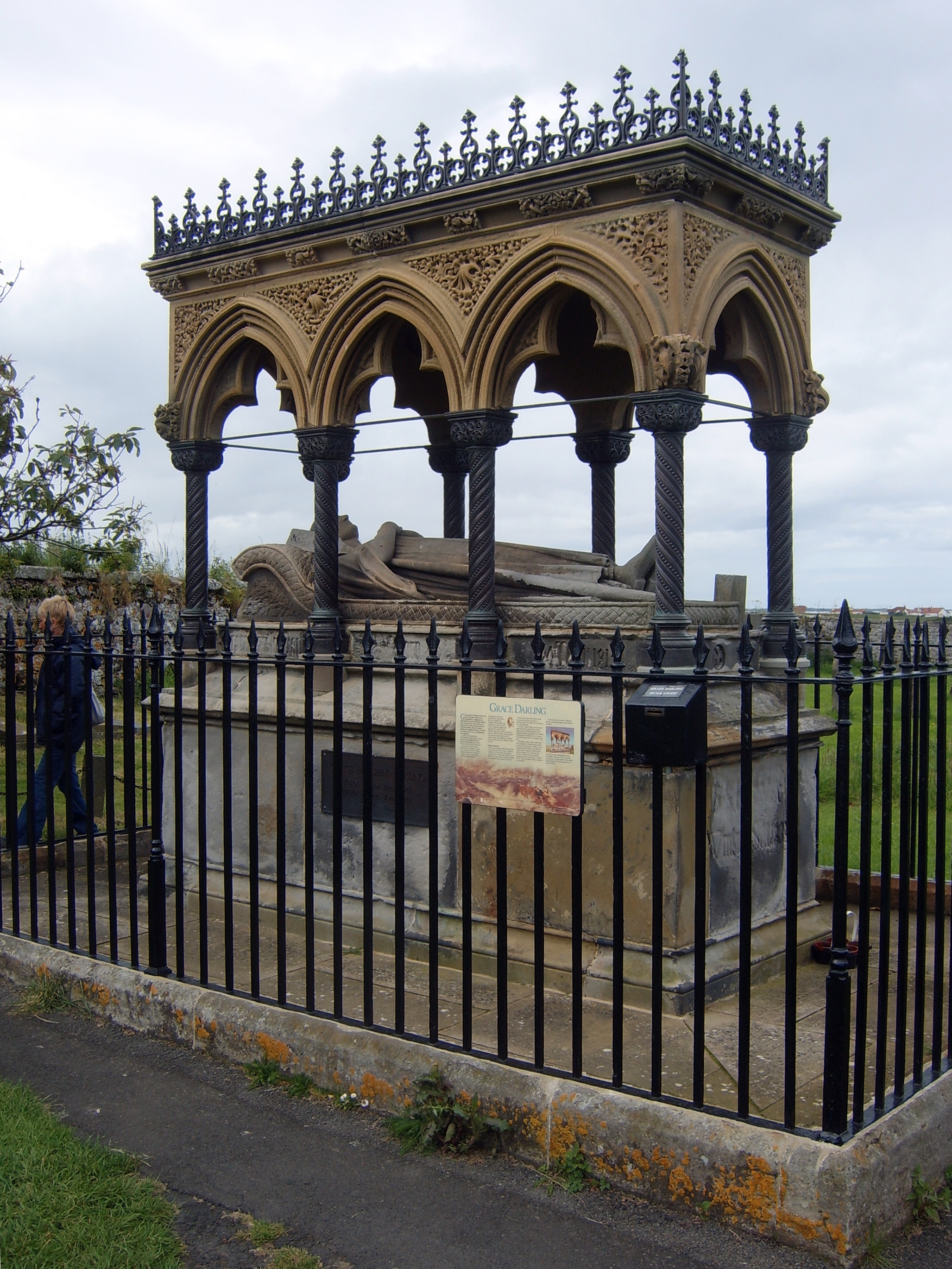
Monument in St Aidan's churchyard, Bamburgh

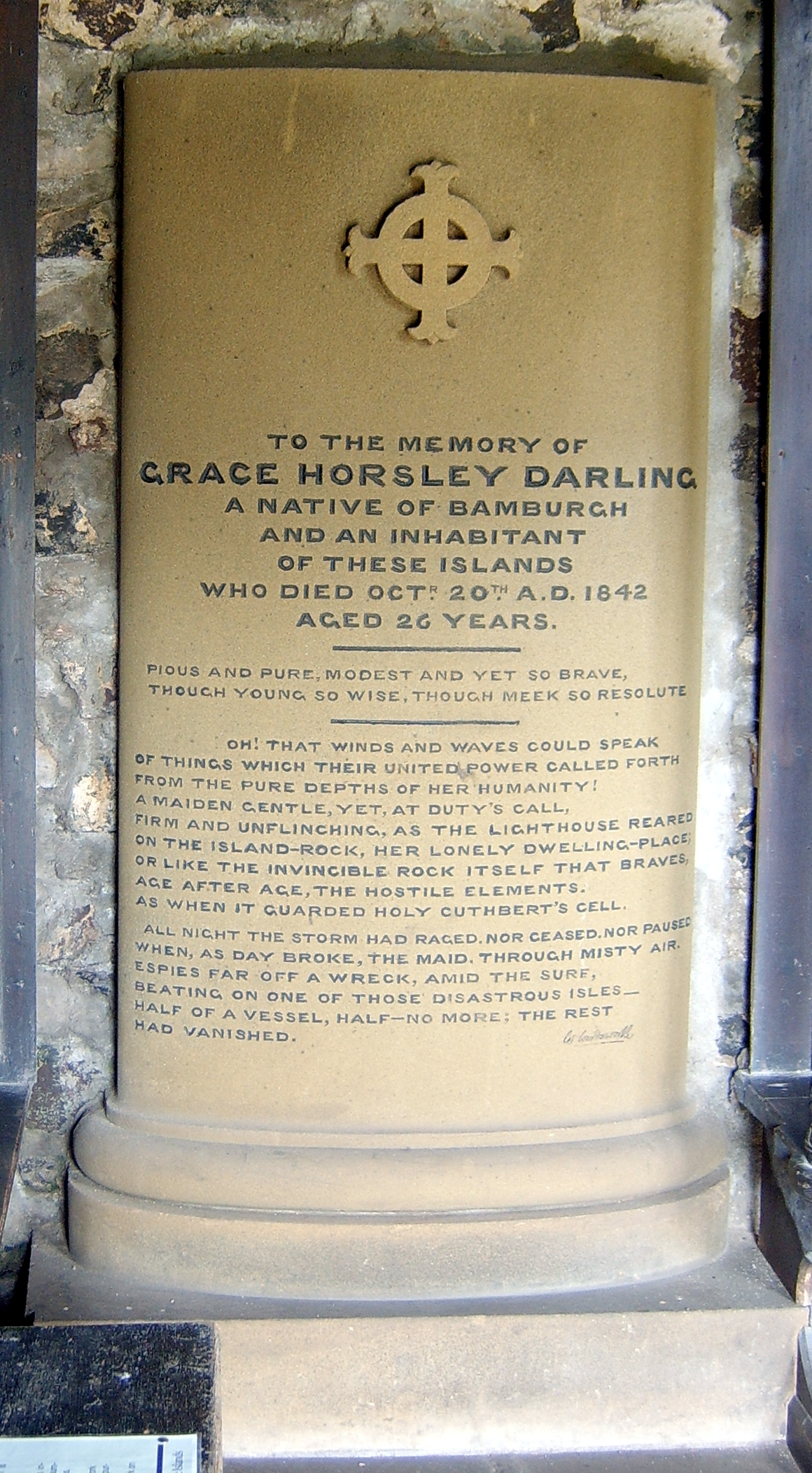
Memorial in St Cuthbert's chapel, Inner Farne

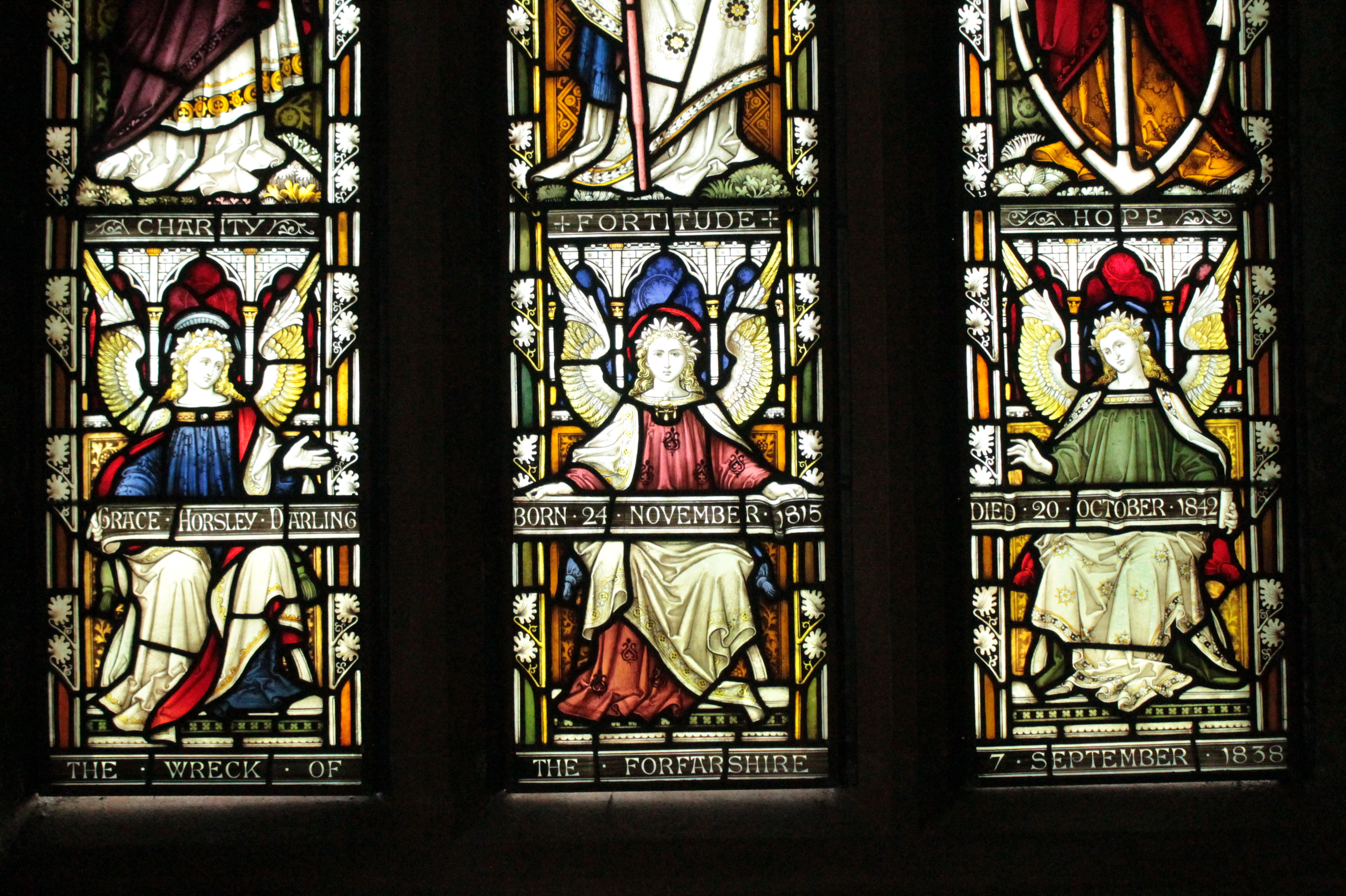
Memorial window to Grace Darling in St Aidan's Church

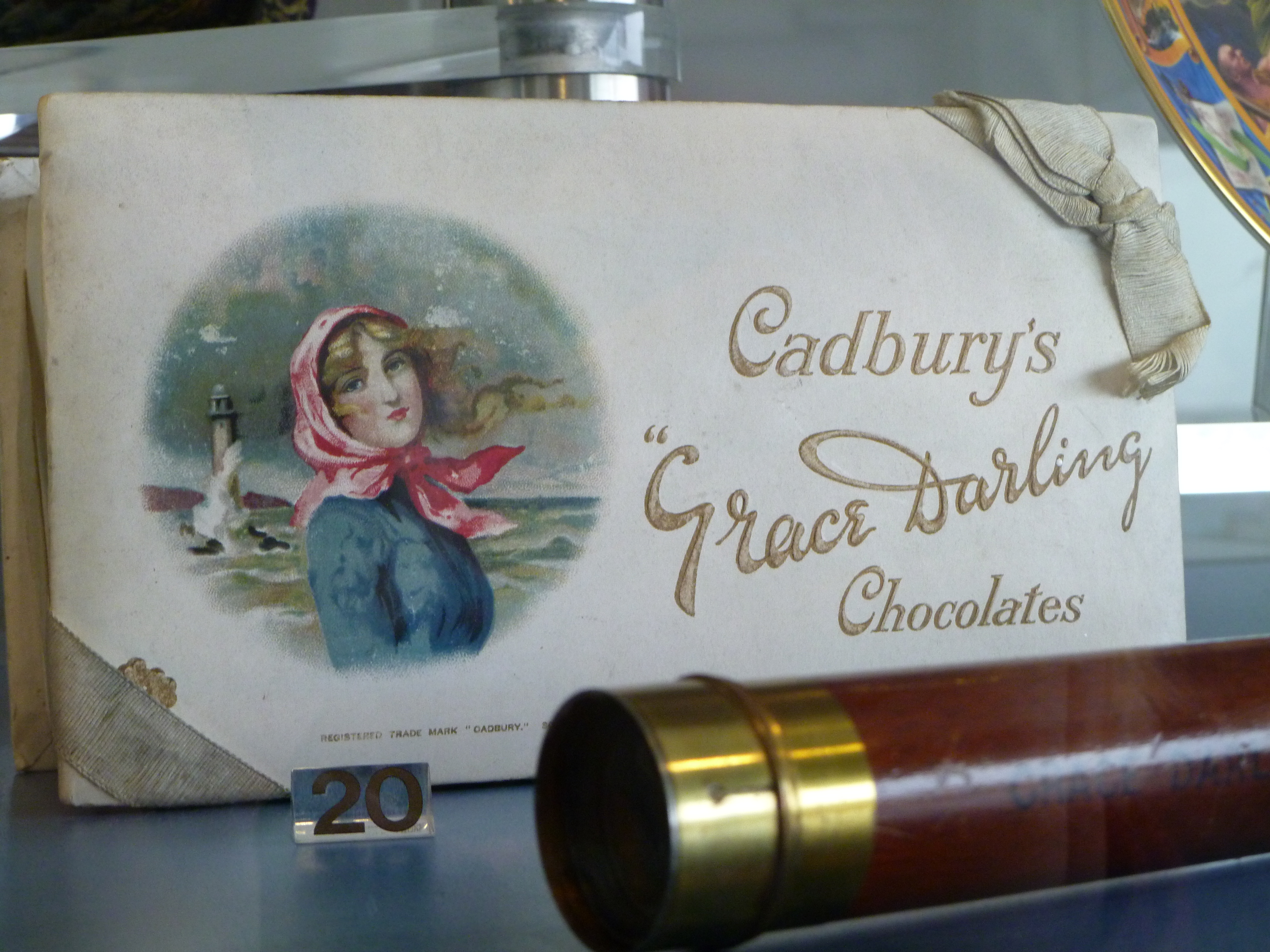
The wrapper of a chocolate bar featuring the image of Grace Darling, from the Grace Darling Museum

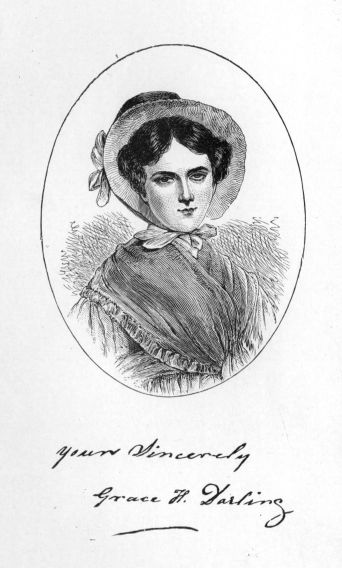
Frontispiece image of Grace from Grace Darling – Heroine of the Farne Islands by Eva Hope

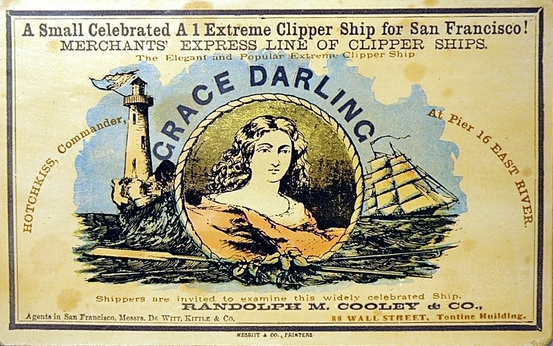
Grace Darling A1 Extreme Clipper sailing card

== See also ==
- Monument to Grace Darling in St Aidan's Churchyard
- Ida Walley Lewis, an American lighthouse keeper noted for rescuing numerous people in the latter half of the 19th century
- Grace Bussell, a 16-year-old Australian girl who along with Sam Isaacs rescued 50 people from the SS Georgette when it foundered off the West Australian coast in 1876, is regarded as Australia's national heroine. At the time of the rescue, Bussell was referred to as the "Grace Darling of the West" by journalists.
- Ann Harvey, a Newfoundland 17-year-old who in 1828, with her father, brother, and dog, rescued 163 shipwrecked people
- Roberta Boyd, a New Brunswick girl who was hailed as the "Grace Darling of the St. Croix" after a rescue in 1882
- Abigail Becker, a Canadian woman also known as the 'Angel of Long Point' who saved the lives of seventeen people across five incidents, including shipwrecks

== Sources ==
- Christie, Rev James (1904). Northumberland: Its History, Its Features, and Its People (2nd ed.). Carlisle: Chas. Thurnam & Sons.
