= Thomas Musgrave Joy =

English painter (1812–1866)

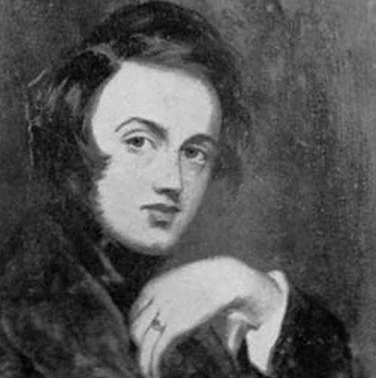
- Self-portrait
- Born: Thomas Musgrove Joy; 9 July 1812; Boughton Monchelsea, England
- Died: 7 April 1866 (aged 53); Pimlico, England
- Known for: Painting

Thomas Musgrave Joy (9 July 1812 – 7 April 1866) was a British portraitist.

== Life ==
Joy was born on 9 July 1812 in Boughton Hall in Boughton Monchelsea where his father was the squire. His parents, Thomas and Susanah, were not keen on his choice of career but he was allowed to leave Kent to study with Samuel Drummond in London. By 1831 he was exhibiting at the Royal Academy. The McManus Galleries in Dundee today exhibit Joy's substantial commissions to paint Grace Darling and her father William, who had become Victorian heroes after rescuing sailors from the distressed Forfarshire paddle steamer. Joy also painted a re-creation of the wreck for his patron Lord Panmure and this is also in the same galleries in Dundee. Panmure was generous with this good-looking artist, encouraging him to visit the continent and paying for John Phillip to become his student briefly in 1836.

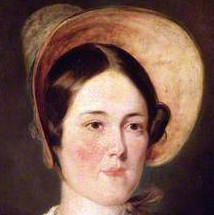
Detail from Joy's portrait of Grace Darling

Joy married Eliza Rohde Spratt in 1839 and two years later received a Royal Commission that recognised him as an established artist. The newly married couple lived at No. 8 Fitzroy Street in the London parish of St Pancras. He painted the Queen's dogs as well as the Prince of Wales, the Duke of Cambridge and the Princess Royal. These paintings are in the Royal Collection.

Joy was in demand as a portrait painter and he created paintings of General Sir Charles James Napier who had achieved victories in what is now called Pakistan. A large group painting exhibited in 1864 records the most important people at Tattersalls before a race. Joy's habits of overwork are said to have led to a bout of bronchitis that resulted in his death in 1866. In the same year his eighteen-year-old eldest daughter, Mary Eliza, exhibited her first painting at the Royal Academy.

Joy died in Pimlico at 32 St Georges Square.

== Legacy ==
Joy had exhibited regularly throughout his career at the Society of British Artists and at the British Institution. Besides the paintings in Dundee he also has a number in public collections including the Victoria and Albert Museum.
