= George Augustus Frederick Lake =

The Honourable George Augustus Frederick Lake
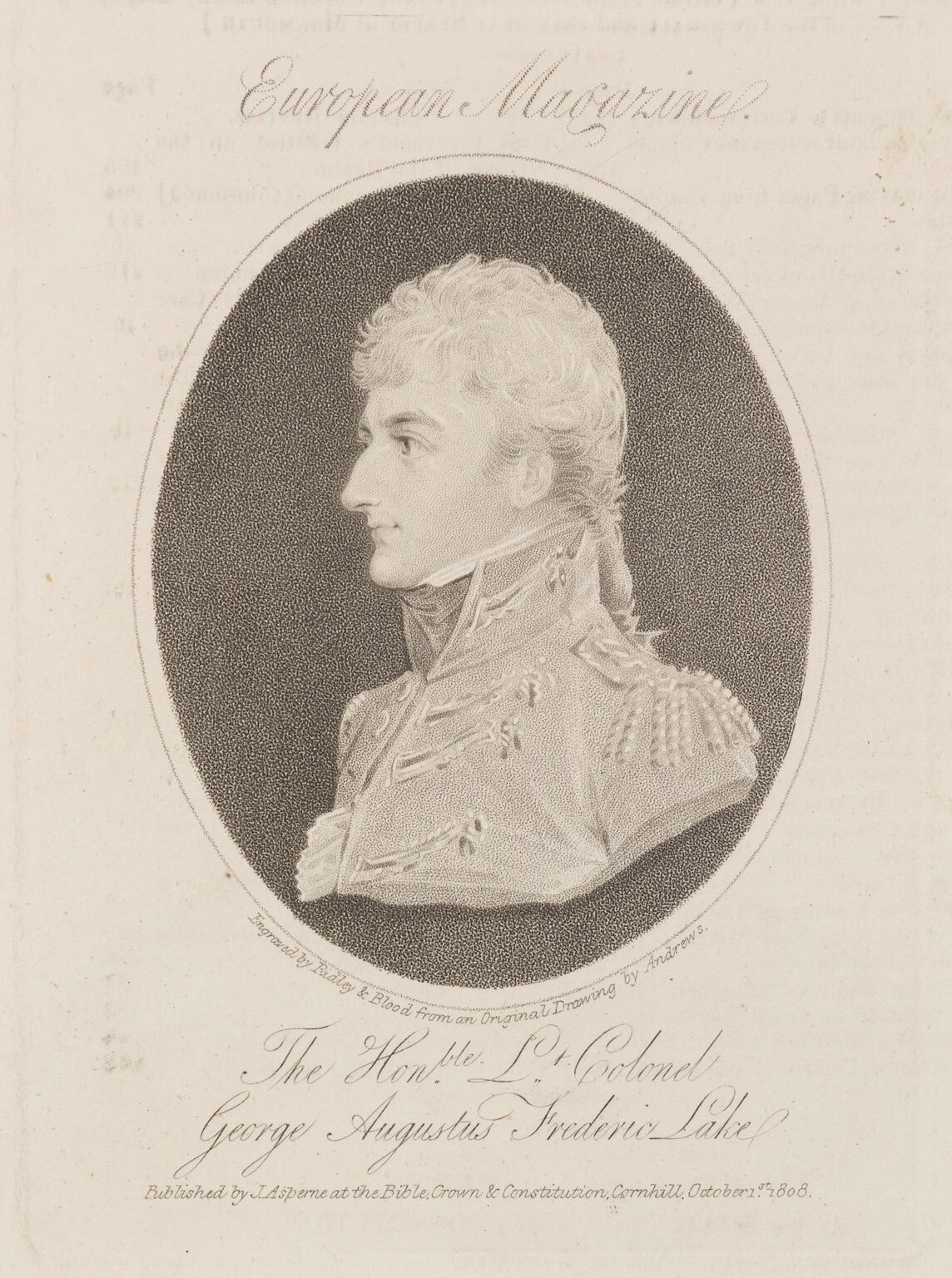
- Stipple engraving portrait of Lake
- Born: 21 February 1781
- Died: 17 August 1808 (aged 27); Roliça, Portugal
- Burial place: Roliça, Portugal
- Military career
- Allegiance: Great Britain; United Kingdom
- Branch: British Army
- Service years: c. 1798–1808
- Rank: Lieutenant colonel
- Units: 94th Regiment of Foot; 2nd Infantry Division
- Commands: 29th Regiment of Foot
- Conflicts: Irish Rebellion of 1798; Second Anglo-Maratha War; Battle of Laswari; Napoleonic Wars; Peninsular War; Battle of Roliça †

Lieutenant-Colonel George Augustus Frederick Lake (21 February 1781 – 17 August 1808) was a British Army officer who served in the Irish Rebellion of 1798, Second Anglo-Maratha War and Napoleonic Wars. He commanded the 29th Regiment of Foot during the early stages of the Peninsular War.

== Early life ==
George Augustus Frederick Lake was born on 21 February 1781. His father was the British Army officer Gerard Lake. Lake's family were well-connected at the British court, and in 1790 he was appointed as one of the Prince of Wales' Pages of Honour.

== Military career in Ireland and India ==
In c. 1798, Lake joined the British Army and served as his father's aide-de-camp and military secretary, participating in the Irish Rebellion of 1798 and Second Anglo-Maratha War. By 1803, he had risen to the rank of major in the 94th Regiment of Foot and fought at Battle of Laswari on 1 November. At the battle, Lake was seriously wounded and was helped his father to remount another horse after he had his horse shot from under him.

== Peninsular War and death ==
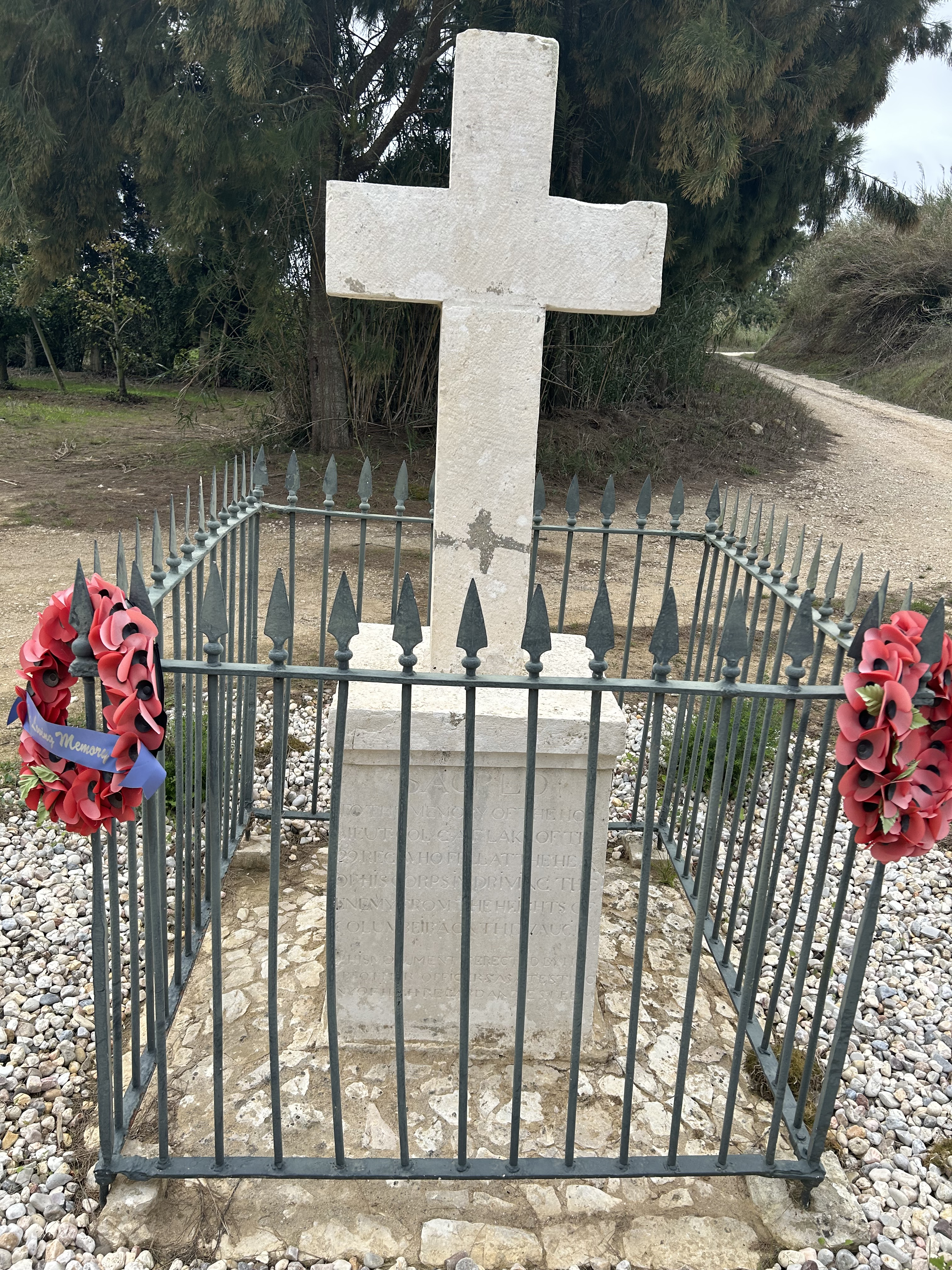
Lake's grave in Roliça

In early 1808 Lake, now at the rank of lieutenant colonel in the 29th Regiment of Foot, embarked with his regiment from Britain and travelling via Gibraltar landed in the Iberian Peninsula in June 1808. One of the regiment's officers claimed that they were one of the first British units to do so. On 17 August 1808, Lake was killed in action at the Battle of Roliça. Lake was leading the 29th's grenadier company into a mountain pass when they were fired on entrenched French infantry, killing Lake, though his men succeeded in routing the French. He was buried by his men after the battle close to the spot where he died; a memorial plaque, sculpted by James Smith, was installed in Westminster Abbey commemorating his death. His father had predeceased him by six months having died shortly after his son's regiment had sailed for Gibraltar.
