= James Smith (sculptor) =

James Smith (1775–1815) was a Brutish sculptor.

== Life ==
Smith lived in the Marylebone district of London. He was the son of James Smith, also a sculptor or stonemason.

He trained under the London-based Italian sculptor Locatelli from 1789 to around 1794. From 1795 he attended the Royal Academy Schools. In 1797 he won their gold medal for "Venus Wounded by Diomede". After training he joined the studio of John Charles Felix Rossi.

After 1805 he became assistant to John Flaxman. He also assisted Mrs Damer on several works.

In 1810 he was commissioned by the Common Council of Aldermen to create a cenotaph to Admiral Nelson for the Guildhall, London. This marble monument cost £4442 (£360,000 in 2021) and was won in competition against his mentor Charles Rossi and against the recommendation of the Royal Academy. The Aldermen however were very slow in paying his bill.

He died in London on 28 April 1815.

== Family ==
He was father to Charles Raymond Smith who was also a sculptor, creating the infamous tomb of Grace Darling in Bamburgh churchyard. He may have also had a second son, Thomas Smith.

== Known works ==
- Monument to Lord Mansfield, St Paul's Cathedral (while at the studio of Flaxman)
- Memorial to Lt Col George Augustus Frederick Lake (1808) in Westminster Abbey
- Tomb of Caroline Shuckburgh (1809) in Shuckburgh Parish Church
- Monument to Horatio Nelson (1810) Guildhall
- Bust of Sarah Siddons (1813), Green Room at Drury Lane Theatre
- Bust of Sarah Siddons (1814) at Guy's Cliff, Warwick
- Bust of Robert Southey (1814) displayed at Royal Academy
- Tomb of Thomas Barwis (1815) in Wandsworth Parish Church
- Monument to General John le Marchant (1816) in St Paul's Cathedral completed by Smith's son
