= Roberta Boyd =

Roberta Beatrice "Bertha" Boyd (16 June 1862 – 10 January 1944), sometimes listed as Roberta Grace, was a Canadian lighthouse keeper and heroine known as the 'Grace Darling of the St. Croix'.

== Early life ==
Roberta was born on 16 June 1862 to John and Kate Boyd. Her father, John Boyd, was the keeper of the Spruce Point Light near St. Stephen, New Brunswick. Roberta and her mother would tend the light when her father was away.

== St. Croix River rescue ==
On 8 October 1882, Boyd saved two men whose sailing boat had overturned in the river, and rowed them back to shore. For this action she was awarded a gold watch by the Government of Canada with the words "In recognition of her humane exertions in saving life in the St. Croix River" inscribed on it; in addition, the Department of Marine and Fisheries presented her with a new boat with "Roberta Grace Boyd, Grace Darling of the Saint Croix" on the helm.

== Later life ==
After her father's death on 15 September 1892, Boyd became keeper of the light. She served as keeper at Spruce Point until at least 1922 (when records were no longer published).

Boyd married Herbert LeRoy Hannah on 18 October 1900 in The Ledge, St. Stephens Parish, New Brunswick.

She died on 10 January 1944.
