= Mary Eliza Haweis =

British author

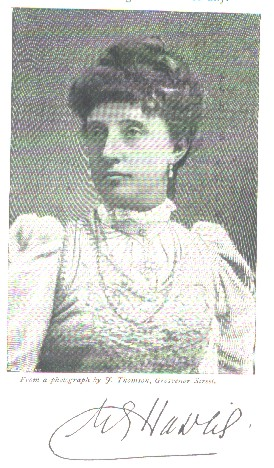
Mary Eliza Haweis

Mary Eliza Haweis, née Joy (21 February 1848 – 24 November 1898) was a British author of books and essays, particularly for women, and a scholar of Geoffrey Chaucer, illustrator and painter. The daughter of genre and portrait painter, Thomas Musgrave Joy, she was known for her art and literature. In her early life, she mainly focused on painting, drawing, and illustrating. Her artwork can be seen featured in her husband's works. After marriage, she became versed in literature and history. She both wrote and designed the covers of her own books. Some of her published works include Chaucer for Children (1877), Chaucer for Schools (1881), The Art of Beauty (1878), The Art of Dress (1879), The Art of Decoration (1881), and The Art of Housekeeping (1889), Beautiful Houses (1882), A Flame of Fire (1897). The genres of her work include journalism, politics, philosophy, essays, and fiction novels. She also left many printed articles and papers in manuscript on various subjects.

== Biography ==
Mary Joy was born in Sloane Street, Chelsea, London, in 1848, the eldest of two daughters born to Thomas Musgrave Joy, and Eliza Rohde Joy, née Spratt. Her mother was a daughter of Charles Spratt, of Salisbury, descended in direct line from Bishop Spratt, also Dean of Westminster, a prominent churchman in the reigns of James II and Anne. As her grandfather was a landed proprietor, her father's family seat was Boughton Hall, Monchelsea, Yalding, Kent. A highly acclaimed painter, Thomas Musgrave Joy was commanded by the Queen to paint the Royal children in 1841. He also did several pictures for Prince Albert and his work was praised by a number of the English nobility, including the Duke of Cambridge. She was baptized on 25 February 1848 at St Saviour's Church, Kensington and Chelsea.

Because as a child, she had a very sweet face, Mary served as a model for many of her father's works. However, she was more than a model; she was also his imitator. Like her father, she had a natural gift for painting. Though she did not receive any formal painting instruction, she regularly watched her father work in his studio. When she was drawing or painting, the only assistance she received was her father's guidance. Occasionally, he would survey her work and add in a few lines here and there. Since, at a very early age, she displayed a wonderful eye for color, her father sent her drawings to an exhibition when she was six or seven.

Aged 18, she exhibited a painting at the Royal Academy under her maiden name Miss M. E. Joy in 1866, the same year her father died at age 54. Bought on the private view day, her picture illustrated one of Jean Ingelow's poems. She undertook portrait commissions as well. After her father's death, she completed several of his unfinished orders. Though she excelled in both drawing and painting, she also showed literary promise. Before she could write fluently and elegantly, she practiced copying print in booklets when she was between the ages of seven and ten.

=== Marriage and family ===
When she was seventeen or eighteen, she became a member of Reverend Hugh Reginald Haweis's congregation at St. James the Less, Westminster, always writing notes of his sermons with pen and paper as he spoke. On 30 November 1867, a year after her father's death, she married Haweis at St. Mary's Church, Kilburn. As newlyweds they resided at Welbeck St, at 16 St. Marylebone, London. They had four children together. Their first-born son, Reginald Joy, died in infancy in 1869, but three further children survived to adulthood: Lionel (b. 1870), Hugolin Olive (b.1873), and Stephen Hugh Wyllyams (b. 1878), who also became a painter. In the 1880 England Census, the family is recorded as living at 34 St Johns Wood Rd, St. Marylebone with a nurse, cook, and footman.

As Reverend Haweis was a popular preacher, Mary Eliza Haweis accompanied her husband on preaching tours of the continent and North America. Soon her travels abroad became an annual occurrence, enabling her to visit many great art galleries in European countries such as France, Germany, and Italy. In 1885, she and her husband traveled to America, where Reverend Haweis was a lecturer at Boston and a University preacher at Harvard. Mrs. Haweis's visit to the Chicago exhibition in 1893 resulted in her portrait being featured in the Chicago Herald.

== Career and literary works ==
After her marriage, Haweis continued to paint; however, she experienced many interruptions caused by social obligations and family matters. In the early stages of her career, she produced some beautiful woodcuts for Cassell's Magazine, which her husband edited, and for Good Words. Reverend H.R. Haweis was also an author. Beginning with his book for children, Pet; or Pastimes and Penalties (1874), she began illustrating and designing the covers of his books. Over the course of her marriage, she began to shift her interests from art to literature.

=== Chaucer scholarship and illustrations ===
Combining a widespread interest in art, fashion, history, and literature, and to supplement the household income, she soon wrote books on subjects of interest to her. Haweis published several works on topics related to medieval and modern art design, with emphasis on viewer comprehension and use for improved artistic surroundings. She often reused material from one publication for another. For example, her essays on artistic houses that were first published in the magazine, The Queen, in 1880–81 were then reprinted in Beautiful Houses (1882). Some of her works in Chaucer for Schools (1881) were reused material from Chaucer for Children (1877).

During her spare time, she occupied herself with antiquarian studies in connection with the work of Geoffrey Chaucer, a medieval English poet and author. She believed that Chaucer's poetic lines could be enjoyed by anyone who had "moderate intelligence and an ear for musical rhythm." As one of his most enthusiastic students, she became a Chaucerian and popularized a number of Chaucer's stories from The Canterbury Tales and some of the shorter poems in anthologies designed for children and for adult non-scholarly readers. She not only provided modernized translations and Pre-Raphaelite illustrations of key scenes from the tales, but also included the type of critical apparatus otherwise only available in the contemporary scholarly editions published by Frederick James Furnivall, Walter W. Skeat, and Richard Morris. Her adaptations played a role in widening general access to Chaucer's poetry and in promoting the reading of Middle English verse in its original. She is also the first Chaucerian/art historian to link Chaucer's poetry to existing paintings and drawings.

Usually giving her name as Mrs. H. R. Haweis, she first wrote her well-known Chaucer for Children: a Golden Key (1877) which she also illustrated herself, skillfully combining both Haweis' knowledge of art and familiarity with literature. Ostensibly, it was intended to function as a historically accurate description of medieval costume and furniture, illustrated with woodcuts and color plates (i.e.detailed chromo-lithograph drawings) whose details were drawn from medieval manuscripts. This book introduced British children to Chaucer's works and legacy. Highly appreciated by the public, the first edition sold out quickly. A reader of the book wrote to a newspaper, ‘[It] Unmistakably presents the best means yet provided of introducing young pupils to the study of our first great poet.’—Scotsman." In 1881, Sir John Lubbock also included the book in his list of the "Hundred Best Books" to read. Just after Mrs. Haweis' passing, a copy of the book was sent to the Queen, who acknowledged it through her secretary in the following gracious exchange: "I am commanded to say that it gives her Majesty great pleasure to possess the beautifully-bound copy of Chaucer for Children that you have forwarded on behalf of Mrs. Haweis. In offering you her sincere sympathy in this your very sad and heavy bereavement, the Queen desires me to say that the book acquires for her, together with the inscription that coveys it, a special interest, owing to the pathetic circumstances under with it comes."

The depth of Haweis's erudition in Chaucer's Beads (1884) reflects her close reading of Chaucer's text. To reveal its hidden messages, she summoned the aid of scholars and manuscripts, pondered the meanings of words and expressions, and sought their origins in other languages. As a result of her work as a Chaucerian, Haweis became a unique and significant figure. Also, she established herself in the male-dominated world of nineteenth-century Chaucer scholars, still perceived as an important influence in keeping Chaucer alive in the public consciousness and readily accessible in the Victorian Era.

A focal point of her interest in Chaucer's canon was the Miller's Tale, upon which she wrote much exceptional work, more than any other Victorian writer; she translated and adapted it for adult males, adult females, and children; published two different explications of the story; and discussed it at length in separate articles. Ultimately, she turned a taboo medieval story containing risqué elements into one appropriate for adolescents, managing to include morals and reminders of proper manners. She also radically changed modern views of what the proper Victorian reader's reception should be to a tale; her imagined audience for this tale is assumed by the narrator to be canny and worldly. The literary reception she received for her work in this book was positive. Her readership of the Miller's Tale, composed of male scholars, women, and children, read and laughed at it.

==== Domestic decor ====
Motivated by her preoccupation with style and domestic order, several books on decoration, dress, and household matters followed. From 1880 she wrote essays on artistic houses, first published in the magazine The Queen, later collected in a book. Although she had servants and attended many social events, money was tight and she had to fund her lifestyle through her writing. Though Haweis was considered to be in the middle-class; she often deceived people as to her true social class with her thrifty yet elegant clothing, composed of economically procured, yet rare laces and exquisite fabrics. Her "rare personal beauty" and "good dressing" made people believe that she could afford costly material. Mary Eliza Haweis' series of publications on domestic decor: The Art of Beauty (1878), based on shorter articles she had written some years earlier for the "Saint Paul's Magazine," The Art of Dress (1879), and The Art of Decoration (1881), demonstrated her knowledge of the broad history of fashion and expressed her views on the dangers some fashions could pose to health. Some of her views on the necessity, even duty of women appearing well led to some good-natured sarcasm directed at the volume by The Contemporary Review, which complained, "In a word, Mrs. Haweis will spare nothing, and not shrink from anything, which will prevent our giving one another the least personal shock; she is for using every means to make quite sure that everybody will visibly delight everybody else. It is very pleasant to think of. Certainly, there would have to be a good deal of dressing going on for this, especially in some cases, and how amidst it all we could be guarded against being upset by glimpses of one another at times before the toilettes were completed, it is not easy to see. However, Mrs. Haweis can only deal with this world as she finds it."

Believing that decoration should be both useful and in harmony with natural proportion, she produced Rus in Urbe: Flowers that Thrive in London Gardens & Smoky Towns (1886) and The Art of Housekeeping: a Bridal Garland (1889), a practical household management guide for newly married women.

== Later life ==
During the last ten or fifteen years of her life, Haweis lost interest in her artistic occupations; instead, she became interested in philanthropic causes and extending the Parliamentary Franchise to women, besides other social causes connected with the interests and general progress of women. For personal protection, she kept a secret revolver concealed in her purse. She joined women's clubs and circles where women's interests were discussed. Though she disliked public speaking, she became an influential public speaker, beloved by audiences.

=== Women's movement and social causes ===
On a visit to Rome, she met several of the women amongst the Roman nobility who were promoting the woman movement in Italy. She admired Queen Margherita for her care and efforts on behalf of poor working girls. Mr. and Mrs. Haweis were welcomed by the Queen personally and invited to a public ball.

In her late years, Haweis also wrote articles on husbands and wives, particularly investigating how the wife might best "survive" with a husband who guards her. Like many other women writers of the nineteenth century, she turned to journalism, adding fashion and domesticity to the subjects of science, religion, and philosophy intended for men. She wrote a lengthy piece with photographs and illustrations for the Lady's Realm in 1897 entitled "The Empress Frederick and Friedrichshof." It was a history of Victoria, Princess Royal, the elder child of Queen Victoria and a German monarch in her own right by marriage who, in Haweis's view, "has left a permanent and noble mark on German history, not only by her domestic devotion, but by all she has tried to do for the elevation of her own sex." Because of her father's portrait painting, Haweis retained early memories of the empress, reminiscing, "The Princess Royal was a very sweet-looking child. I remember a rough drawing of her done by my father, T.M. Joy, by for us children – a softened Georgian face in a quaint cap, and the stiff gown of some old German costume, in which Queen Victoria had commissioned him to sketch the child, I think in 1842: the original, of course, is still possessed by Her Majesty." Late in her life, Haweis developed a strong addiction to occult and astrological studies, which is referenced in the article concerning the Empress Frederick, and left manuscript books full of horoscopes after her death. In line with this interest, she appears to have published an article in The Humanitarian, edited by American suffragette Victoria Woodhull Martin entitled "Astrology Revived" in July 1896.

Her last known publication was the novel A Flame of Fire (1897), written in support of the female suffrage movement and to illustrate the helplessness of women in marriage. In this novel, her heroine Aglae Dorriforth, marries Henry Quekett, "a worthless tyrant" – his subsequent ill-treatment of her roughly dispels the helpless stupor Aglae experienced during their courtship and early marriage and causes her to begin using her own intellectual powers in defense.

Besides advocating for women, Haweis also sympathized with animals; she was part of the anti-vivisection campaign. She expressed her feelings and opposition verbally and in writing. Together with her husband, Mary Haweis also successfully campaigned to have museums opened on Sundays so that the working classes could benefit from the exhibits.

=== Health decline ===
As a result of her demanding life, requiring so much of energy and brain power, Haweis's health became impaired. She was taken to Epsom where she received favorable conditions; however, her health continued to decline. She continued to write as long as she could and remained interested in many causes.

Reflections on her life concurred that she strove for utter perfection and accuracy in all affairs of life, apparently due to her intense activity, brightness of intellect, artistic faculty, and unusual methods. Her annotated diaries were found along with her receipts from the last thirty years, all in order. She spent the last two months of her life at Bath, completing the last of her articles in her final days.

== Death and legacy ==
On 24 November 1898, Mary Eliza Haweis died at Lansdown Grove House, Bath, Somerset, from kidney disease and heart failure. Her body was cremated at Woking on 26 November, and her ashes interred in the Joy family vault at St. Peter's, Boughton Monchelsea, Kent. Her wealth at death was £2,920 17s.

In honor and memory of Mary Eliza Haweis and her unfailing courage and unwearied efforts to support the rights of women, a fund was established in her name. The "Mrs. Haweis' Fund for Working Girls" strove "to enable English and American girls between the ages of twelve and twenty years to learn a self-supporting trade, or engage in a remunerative occupation, either by paying for their instruction, providing them with board, lodging, or outfits, supplying them with traveling money, or a premium for obtaining employment."

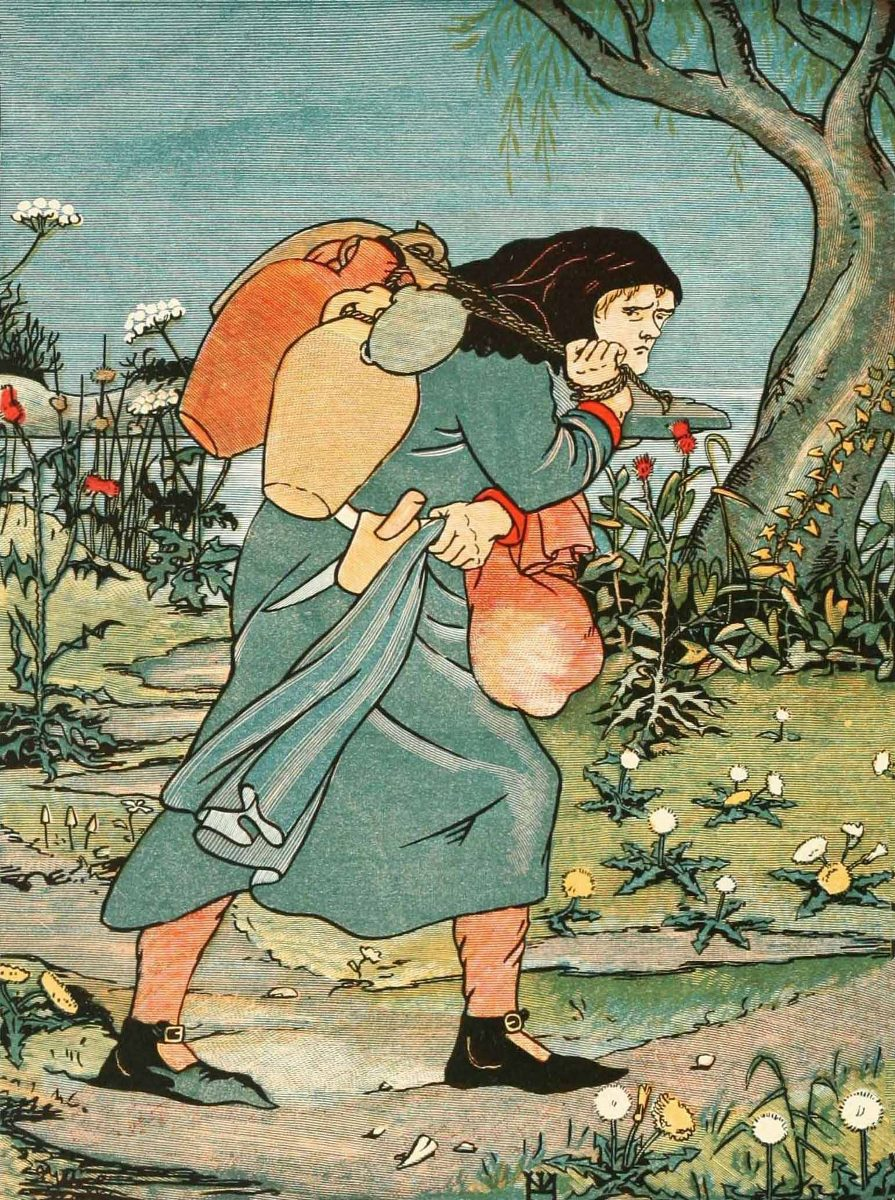
Illustration from Mary Eliza Haweis' Chaucer for Children (1882)

== Publications ==
- Chaucer for Children: a Golden Key (1st edn 1877, 2nd edn 1882)
- The Art of Beauty (1878)
- The Art of Dress (1879)
- The Art of Decoration (1881)
- Chaucer for Schools: With the Story of His Times and Work (1881)
- Beautiful Houses: Being a Description of Certain Well-Known Artistic Houses (1882)
- Chaucer's Beads: a Birthday Book, Diary and Concordance of Chaucer's Proverbs or soothsaws (1884)
- Rus in Urbe: Flowers that Thrive in London Gardens & Smoky Towns (1886)
- Tales from Chaucer (1887)
- The Art of Housekeeping: a Bridal Garland (1889)
- A Flame of Fire: a novel (1897)
