= Hugh Reginald Haweis =

English cleric and writer (1838–1901)

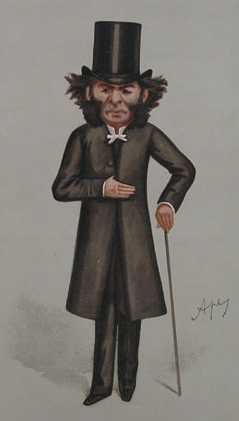
The Rev. Hugh Reginald Haweis, by Carlo Pellegrini, 1888.

Hugh Reginald Haweis (3 April 1838 – 29 January 1901) was an English cleric and writer. He was the husband of author Mary Eliza Haweis and the father of painter Stephen Haweis.

== Biography ==
Haweis was born in Egham, Surrey in 1838, the son of the Rev. John Oliver Willyams Haweis of Brighton, Canon of Chichester. He was educated privately in Sussex and at Trinity College, Cambridge, where he graduated BA in 1860. He travelled in Italy and served under Garibaldi in 1860. On his return to England he was ordained and held various curacies in London, becoming in 1866 incumbent of St James's, Marylebone.

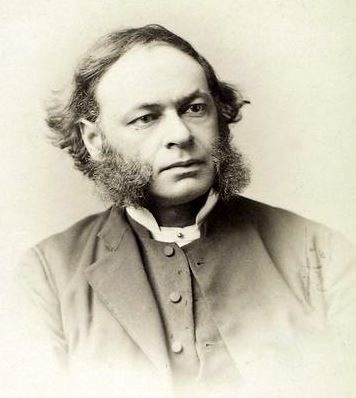
HR Haweis

His unconventional methods of conducting the service, combined with his dwarfish figure and lively manner, soon attracted crowded congregations. He married Mary E. Joy in 1866, and both he and Mrs Haweis (d. 1898) contributed largely to periodical literature and travelled a good deal abroad. Haweis was Lowell lecturer in Boston, in 1885, and represented the Anglican Church at the Chicago Parliament of Religions in 1893.

He was much interested in music, and wrote books on violins and church bells, besides contributing an article to the 9th edition of the Encyclopædia Britannica on "bell". His best-known book was Music and Morals (1871), which went through sixteen editions before the end of the century, and he was for a time from 1868 editor of Cassell's Magazine. He also wrote the five-volume Christ and Christianity, a popular church history (1886–1887), as well as Music and Morals (1892), Travel and Talk (1896) and similar chatty and entertaining books. His book My Musical Life offers a biographical tour through his career and his spiritual leanings in music, tracing his awakening to music, his interest in the Cremonese violin makers and in Paganini, an exposition of The Ring of the Nibelungen, Parsifal, Lohengrin and Tannhäuser, and anecdotes of his meetings with Richard Wagner and Franz Liszt.
